This page lists all described species of the spider family Linyphiidae as of August 28, 2020, from A to H, of World Spider Catalog version 21.5

Abacoproeces
Abacoproeces Simon, 1884
 Abacoproeces molestus Thaler, 1973 — Austria
 Abacoproeces saltuum (L. Koch, 1872) (type species) — Palearctic
 Abacoproeces topcui Türkeş, Karabulut, Demir & Seyyar, 2015 - Turkey

Aberdaria
Aberdaria Holm, 1962
 Aberdaria ligulata Holm, 1962 — Kenya

Abiskoa
Abiskoa Saaristo & Tanasevitch, 2000
 Abiskoa abiskoensis (Holm, 1945) — Palearctic

Acanoides 
Acanoides Sun, Marusik & Tu, 2014
 Acanoides beijingensis Sun, Marusik & Tu, 2014 (type species) - China 
 Acanoides hengshanensis (Chen & Yin, 2000) - China

Acanthoneta 
Acanthoneta Eskov & Marusik, 1992
 Acanthoneta aggressa (Chamberlin & Ivie, 1943) (type species) -   USA, Canada 
 Acanthoneta dokutchaevi (Eskov & Marusik, 1994) - Russia, China 
 Acanthoneta furcata (Emerton, 1913) - USA

Acartauchenius
Acartauchenius Simon, 1884
 Acartauchenius asiaticus (Tanasevitch, 1989) — Turkmenistan
 Acartauchenius bedeli (Simon, 1884) — Algeria
 Acartauchenius derisor (Simon, 1918) — France
 Acartauchenius desertus (Tanasevitch, 1993) — Kazakhstan
 Acartauchenius hamulifer (Denis, 1937) — Algeria
 Acartauchenius himalayensis Tanasevitch, 2011 — Pakistan
 Acartauchenius insigniceps (Simon, 1894) — Morocco, Algeria, Tunisia
 Acartauchenius leprieuri (O. P.-Cambridge, 1875) — Algeria
 Acartauchenius minor (Millidge, 1979) — Italy
 Acartauchenius monoceros (Tanasevitch, 1989) — Uzbekistan
 Acartauchenius mutabilis (Denis, 1967) — Morocco, Algeria, Tunisia
 Acartauchenius orientalis Wunderlich, 1995 — Mongolia
 Acartauchenius planiceps Bosmans, 2002 — Algeria
 Acartauchenius praeceps Bosmans, 2002 — Algeria
 Acartauchenius sardiniensis Wunderlich, 1995 — Sardinia
 Acartauchenius scurrilis (O. P.-Cambridge, 1872) (type species) — Palearctic
 Acartauchenius simoni Bosmans, 2002 — Algeria

Acorigone
Acorigone Wunderlich, 2008
 Acorigone acoreensis (Wunderlich, 1992) — Azores
 Acorigone zebraneus Wunderlich, 2008 (type species) — Azores

Adelonetria
Adelonetria Millidge, 1991
 Adelonetria dubiosa Millidge, 1991 — Chile

Afribactrus
Afribactrus Wunderlich, 1995
 Afribactrus stylifrons Wunderlich, 1995 — South Africa

Afromynoglenes
Afromynoglenes Merrett & Russell-Smith, 1996
 Afromynoglenes parkeri Merrett & Russell-Smith, 1996 — Ethiopia

Afroneta
Afroneta Holm, 1968
 Afroneta altivaga Holm, 1968 — Congo
 Afroneta annulata Merrett, 2004 — Congo
 Afroneta bamilekei Bosmans, 1988 — Cameroon
 Afroneta basilewskyi Holm, 1968 — Tanzania
 Afroneta blesti Merrett & Russell-Smith, 1996 — Ethiopia
 Afroneta elgonensis Merrett, 2004 — Kenya
 Afroneta erecta Merrett, 2004 — Congo
 Afroneta flavescens Frick & Scharff, 2018 — Kenya
 Afroneta fulva Merrett, 2004 — Congo
 Afroneta fusca Merrett, 2004 — Congo
 Afroneta guttata Holm, 1968 — Congo
 Afroneta immaculata Holm, 1968 (type species) — Congo
 Afroneta immaculoides Merrett, 2004 — Congo
 Afroneta lativulva Merrett, 2004 — Congo
 Afroneta lobeliae Merrett, 2004 — Congo
 Afroneta longipalpis Ledoux & Attié, 2008 — Reunion
 Afroneta longispinosa Holm, 1968 — Congo
 Afroneta maculata Merrett, 2004 — Congo
 Afroneta millidgei Merrett & Russell-Smith, 1996 — Ethiopia
 Afroneta pallens Merrett, 2004 — Congo
 Afroneta picta Holm, 1968 — Congo
 Afroneta praticola Holm, 1968 — Tanzania
 Afroneta sarahae Frick & Scharff, 2018 — Kenya
 Afroneta serrata Frick & Scharff, 2018 — Kenya
 Afroneta snazelli Merrett & Russell-Smith, 1996 — Ethiopia
 Afroneta subfusca Holm, 1968 — Congo
 Afroneta subfuscoides Merrett, 2004 — Congo
 Afroneta tenuivulva Merrett, 2004 — Congo
 Afroneta tristis Merrett, 2004 — Congo

Agnyphantes
Agnyphantes Hull, 1932
 Agnyphantes arboreus (Emerton, 1915) — Canada
 Agnyphantes expunctus (O. P.-Cambridge, 1875) (type species) — Palearctic

Agyneta
Agyneta Hull, 1911
 Agyneta adami (Millidge, 1991) — Brazil
 Agyneta affinis (Kulczynski, 1898) — Palearctic
 Agyneta affinisoides Tanasevitch, 1984 — Russia
 Agyneta albinotata (Millidge, 1991) — Colombia
 Agyneta alboguttata (Jocque, 1985) — Comoro Islands
 Agyneta albomaculata (Baert, 1990) — Galapagos Islands
 Agyneta allosubtilis Loksa, 1965 — Holarctic
 Agyneta alpica Tanasevitch, 2000 — Switzerland, Austria
 Agyneta amersaxatilis Saaristo & Koponen, 1998 — USA, Canada, Alaska, Russia
 Agyneta angulata (Emerton, 1882) — USA, Canada
 Agyneta aquila Duperre, 2013 — Canada
 Agyneta arida (Baert, 1990) — Galapagos Islands
 Agyneta arietans (O. P.-Cambridge, 1872) — Germany, Poland
 Agyneta atra (Millidge, 1991) — Venezuela
 Agyneta barfoot Duperre, 2013 — USA
 Agyneta barrowsi (Chamberlin & Ivie, 1944) — USA, Canada
 Agyneta bermudensis (Strand, 1906) — Bermuda
 Agyneta birulai (Kulczynski, 1908) — Russia, China
 Agyneta birulaioides Wunderlich, 1995 — Ukarine, Kazakhstan, Russia, Mongolia
 Agyneta boninensis (Saito, 1982) — Japan
 Agyneta breviceps Hippa & Oksala, 1985 — Finland
 Agyneta brevipes (Keyserling, 1886) — USA, Alaska
 Agyneta brevis (Millidge, 1991) — Peru
 Agyneta bronx Duperre, 2013 — USA
 Agyneta brusnewi (Kulczynski, 1908) — Russia
 Agyneta bucklei Duperre, 2013 — USA, Canada
 Agyneta bueko Wunderlich, 1983 — Nepal
 Agyneta bulavintsevi Tanasevitch, 2016 - Russia (Europe, Siberia) 
 Agyneta canariensis Wunderlich, 1987 — Canary Islands
 Agyneta castanea (Millidge, 1991) — Chile
 Agyneta catalina Duperre, 2013 — USA
 Agyneta cauta (O. P.-Cambridge, 1902) — Palearctic
 Agyneta chiricahua Duperre, 2013 — USA
 Agyneta cincta (Millidge, 1991) — Colombia
 Agyneta collina (Millidge, 1991) — Colombia
 Agyneta conigera (O. P.-Cambridge, 1863) — Palearctic, Congo
 Agyneta crawfordi Duperre, 2013 — USA
 Agyneta crista Duperre, 2013 — USA
 Agyneta cuneata Tanasevitch, 2014 -  Russia 
 Agyneta curvata (Bosmans, 1979) — Kenya
 Agyneta dactylis (Tao, Li & Zhu, 1995) — China
 Agyneta danielbelangeri Duperre, 2013 — USA, Canada
 Agyneta darrelli Duperre, 2013 — USA, Canada
 Agyneta decora (O. P.-Cambridge, 1871) (type species) — Holarctic
 Agyneta decorata (Chamberlin & Ivie, 1944) — USA
 Agyneta decurvis (Tao, Li & Zhu, 1995) — China
 Agyneta delphina Duperre, 2013 — USA
 Agyneta dentifera (Locket, 1968) — Nigeria, Angola
 Agyneta depigmentata Wunderlich, 2008 — Azores
 Agyneta discolor (Millidge, 1991) — Colombia
 Agyneta disjuncta (Millidge, 1991) — Colombia
 Agyneta dynica Saaristo & Koponen, 1998 — USA, Canada
 Agyneta emertoni (Roewer, 1942) — Canada
 Agyneta equestris (L. Koch, 1881) — Central Europe, Ukraine
 Agyneta erinacea Duperre, 2013 — USA
 Agyneta evadens (Chamberlin, 1925) — USA, Canada
 Agyneta exigua (Russell-Smith, 1992) — Cameroon, Nigeria
 Agyneta fabra (Keyserling, 1886) — USA, Canada
 Agyneta falcata (Li & Zhu, 1995) — China
 Agyneta fillmorana (Chamberlin, 1919) — USA, Canada
 Agyneta flandroyae (Jocque, 1985) — Comoro Islands
 Agyneta flavipes (Ono, 1991) — Japan
 Agyneta flax Duperre, 2013 — USA
 Agyneta flibuscrocus Duperre, 2013 — USA
 Agyneta floridana (Banks, 1896) — USA
 Agyneta fratrella (Chamberlin, 1919) — USA
 Agyneta frigida (Millidge, 1991) — Colombia
 Agyneta furcula Seo, 2018 — Korea
 Agyneta fusca (Millidge, 1991) — Peru
 Agyneta fuscipalpa (C. L. Koch, 1836) — Palearctic
 Agyneta gagnei (Gertsch, 1973) — Hawaii
 Agyneta galapagosensis (Baert, 1990) — Galapagos Islands, Brazil
 Agyneta girardi Duperre, 2013 — USA, Canada
 Agyneta gracilipes (Holm, 1968) — Cameroon, Gabon, Congo, Kenya, Angola
 Agyneta grandcanyon Duperre, 2013 — USA
 Agyneta gulosa (L. Koch, 1869) — Palearctic
 Agyneta habra (Locket, 1968) — Africa
 Agyneta hedini Paquin & Duperre, 2009 — USA
 Agyneta ignorata (Saito, 1982) — Japan
 Agyneta inermis Tanasevitch, 2019 — Italy, Greece
 Agyneta innotabilis (O. P.-Cambridge, 1863) — Europe, Russia
 Agyneta insolita (Locket & Russell-Smith, 1980) — Nigeria
 Agyneta insulana Tanasevitch, 2000 — Sakhalin, Kurile Islands
 Agyneta iranica Tanasevitch, 2011 — Iran
 Agyneta issaqueena Duperre, 2013 — USA
 Agyneta jacksoni (Braendegaard, 1937) — USA, Canada, Alaska, Greenland
 Agyneta jiriensis Wunderlich, 1983 — Nepal
 Agyneta kaszabi (Loksa, 1965) — Russia, Kazakhstan, Mongolia
 Agyneta kopetdaghensis Tanasevitch, 1989 — Iran, Turkmenistan
 Agyneta laimonasi Tanasevitch, 2006 — Russia
 Agyneta larva (Locket, 1968) — Angola
 Agyneta lauta (Millidge, 1991) — Peru
 Agyneta ledfordi Duperre, 2013 — USA
 Agyneta leucophora (Chamberlin & Ivie, 1944) — USA
 Agyneta levii Tanasevitch, 1984 — Russia
 Agyneta levis (Locket, 1968) — Angola
 Agyneta lila (Dönitz & Strand, 1906) — Japan
 Agyneta llanoensis (Gertsch & Davis, 1936) — USA
 Agyneta longipes (Chamberlin & Ivie, 1944) — USA
 Agyneta lophophor (Chamberlin & Ivie, 1933) — USA, Canada, Alaska
 Agyneta luctuosa (Millidge, 1991) — Venezuela
 Agyneta manni (Crawford & Edwards, 1989) — USA
 Agyneta maritima (Emerton, 1919) — Russia, Mongolia, Canada, Alaska
 Agyneta martensi Tanasevitch, 2006 — China
 Agyneta mediocris (Millidge, 1991) — Colombia
 Agyneta mendosa (Millidge, 1991) — Colombia
 Agyneta merretti (Locket, 1968) — Angola
 Agyneta mesasiatica Tanasevitch, 2000 — Russia, Iran, Central Asia
 Agyneta metatarsialis Tanasevitch, 2014 -  Russia 
 Agyneta metropolis (Russell-Smith & Jocque, 1986) — Kenya
 Agyneta micaria (Emerton, 1882) — USA, Canada
 Agyneta milleri (Thaler et al., 1997) — Czech Republic, Slovakia
 Agyneta mingshengzhui (Barrion, Barrion-Dupo & Heong, 2013) - China 
 Agyneta miniata Duperre, 2013 — USA
 Agyneta minorata (Chamberlin & Ivie, 1944) — USA
 Agyneta mollis (O. P.-Cambridge, 1871) — Palearctic, Alaska, Canada
 Agyneta mongolica (Loksa, 1965) — Russia, Mongolia
 Agyneta montana (Millidge, 1991) — Ecuador
 Agyneta montivaga (Millidge, 1991) — Venezuela
 Agyneta mossica (Schikora, 1993) — Britain to Russia
 Agyneta muriensis Wunderlich, 1983 — Nepal
 Agyneta natalensis (Jocque, 1984) — South Africa
 Agyneta nigra (Oi, 1960) — Russia, Mongolia, China, Korea, Japan
 Agyneta nigripes (Simon, 1884) — Canada, Greenland, Palearctic
 Agyneta nigripes nivicola (Simon, 1929) — France
 Agyneta obscura (Denis, 1950) — Congo, Tanzania
 Agyneta oculata (Millidge, 1991) — Peru
 Agyneta okefenokee Duperre, 2013 — USA
 Agyneta olivacea (Emerton, 1882) — Holarctic
 Agyneta opaca (Millidge, 1991) — Colombia
 Agyneta ordinaria (Chamberlin & Ivie, 1947) — USA, Canada, Alaska
 Agyneta orites (Thorell, 1875) — Central Europe
 Agyneta pakistanica Tanasevitch, 2011 — Pakistan
 Agyneta palgongsanensis (Paik, 1991) — Russia, China, Korea
 Agyneta palustris (Li & Zhu, 1995) — China
 Agyneta panthera Duperre, 2013 — USA
 Agyneta paquini Duperre, 2013 — USA
 Agyneta paraprosecta Tanasevitch, 2010 — UAE
 Agyneta parva (Banks, 1896) — USA
 Agyneta perspicua Duperre, 2013 — USA, Canada, Alaska
 Agyneta picta (Chamberlin & Ivie, 1944) — USA
 Agyneta pinicola Gnelitsa, 2014 - Ukraine 
 Agyneta pinta (Baert, 1990) — Galapagos Islands
 Agyneta pistrix Duperre, 2013 — USA
 Agyneta plagiata (Banks, 1929) — Panama
 Agyneta platnicki Duperre, 2013 — USA
 Agyneta pogonophora (Locket, 1968) — Angola, Seychelles
 Agyneta prima (Millidge, 1991) — Colombia
 Agyneta propinqua (Millidge, 1991) — Peru, Brazil
 Agyneta propria (Millidge, 1991) — Ecuador
 Agyneta prosectes (Locket, 1968) — St. Helena, Africa
 Agyneta prosectoides (Locket & Russell-Smith, 1980) — Cameroon, Nigeria
 Agyneta protrudens (Chamberlin & Ivie, 1933) — USA, Canada
 Agyneta proxima (Millidge, 1991) — Colombia
 Agyneta pseudofuscipalpis Wunderlich, 1983 — Nepal
 Agyneta pseudorurestris Wunderlich, 1980 — Portugal, Spain, Cyprus, Sardinia, Algeria, Tunisia, Israel
 Agyneta pseudosaxatilis Tanasevitch, 1984 — Russia, Kazakhstan
 Agyneta punctata Wunderlich, 1995 — Greece, Turkey
 Agyneta ramosa Jackson, 1912 — Palearctic
 Agyneta regina (Chamberlin & Ivie, 1944) — USA
 Agyneta ressli (Wunderlich, 1973) — Germany, Switzerland, Austria, Greece
 Agyneta ripariensis Tanasevitch, 1984 — Russia
 Agyneta rufidorsa (Denis, 1961) — France
 Agyneta rugosa Wunderlich, 1992 — Canary Islands, Azores
 Agyneta rurestris (C. L. Koch, 1836) — Palearctic
 Agyneta saaristoi Tanasevitch, 2000 — Russia, Kazakhstan
 Agyneta sandia Duperre, 2013 — USA
 Agyneta saxatilis (Blackwall, 1844) — Europe, Russia
 Agyneta semipallida (Chamberlin & Ivie, 1944) — USA
 Agyneta serrata (Emerton, 1909) — USA, Canada
 Agyneta serratichelis (Denis, 1964) — Sudan
 Agyneta serratula Wunderlich, 1995 — Mongolia
 Agyneta sheffordiana Duperre & Paquin, 2007 — Canada
 Agyneta silvae (Millidge, 1991) — Peru
 Agyneta similis (Kulczynski, 1926) — Iceland, Finland, Russia, Kazakhstan
 Agyneta simplex (Emerton, 1926) — USA, Canada, Alaska
 Agyneta simplicitarsis (Simon, 1884) — Europe, Russia, Kazakhstan
 Agyneta spicula Duperre, 2013 — USA
 Agyneta straminicola (Millidge, 1991) — Colombia, Ecuador
 Agyneta subnivalis Tanasevitch, 1989 — Central Asia
 Agyneta subtilis (O. P.-Cambridge, 1863) — Palearctic
 Agyneta suecica Holm, 1950 — Sweden, Finland
 Agyneta tenuipes (Ono, 2007) — Japan
 Agyneta tianschanica Tanasevitch, 1989 — Kyrgyzstan
 Agyneta tibialis Tanasevitch, 2005 — Russia
 Agyneta tincta (Jocque, 1985) — Comoro Islands
 Agyneta transversa (Banks, 1898) — Mexico
 Agyneta trifurcata Hippa & Oksala, 1985 — Finland, Russia
 Agyneta tuberculata Duperre, 2013 — USA
 Agyneta unicornis (Tao, Li & Zhu, 1995) — China
 Agyneta unimaculata (Banks, 1892) — USA, Canada
 Agyneta usitata (Locket, 1968) — Nigeria, Angola
 Agyneta uta (Chamberlin, 1920) — USA
 Agyneta uzbekistanica Tanasevitch, 1984 — Central Asia
 Agyneta vera Wunderlich, 1976 — Queensland
 Agyneta vinki Duperre, 2013 — USA
 Agyneta watertoni Duperre, 2013 — Canada
 Agyneta yukona Duperre, 2013 — Canada
 Agyneta yulungiensis Wunderlich, 1983 — Nepal

Agyphantes
Agyphantes Saaristo & Marusik, 2004
 Agyphantes sajanensis (Eskov & Marusik, 1994) — Russia
 Agyphantes sakhalinensis Saaristo & Marusik, 2004 (type species) — Sakhalin Islands

Ainerigone
Ainerigone Eskov, 1993
 Ainerigone saitoi (Ono, 1991) — Russia, Japan

Alioranus
Alioranus Simon, 1926
 Alioranus chiardolae (Caporiacco, 1935) — Turkmenistan to China, Karakorum
 Alioranus diclivitalis Tanasevitch, 1990 — Russia
 Alioranus distinctus Caporiacco, 1935 — Karakorum
 Alioranus minutissimus Caporiacco, 1935 — Karakorum
 Alioranus pastoralis (O. P.-Cambridge, 1872) — Crete, Cyprus, Turkey, Israel, Jordan, Tajikistan
 Alioranus pauper (Simon, 1881) (type species) — Western Mediterranean

Allomengea
Allomengea Strand, 1912
 Allomengea beombawigulensis Namkung, 2002 — Korea
 Allomengea coreana (Paik & Yaginuma, 1969) — Korea
 Allomengea dentisetis (Grube, 1861) — Holarctic
 Allomengea niyangensis (Hu, 2001) — China
 Allomengea scopigera (Grube, 1859) (type species) — Holarctic
 Allomengea vidua (L. Koch, 1879) — Holarctic

Allotiso
Allotiso Tanasevitch, 1990
 Allotiso lancearius (Tanasevitch, 1987) — Turkey, Georgia

Anacornia
Anacornia Chamberlin & Ivie, 1933
 Anacornia microps Chamberlin & Ivie, 1933 (type species) — USA
 Anacornia proceps Chamberlin, 1949 — USA

Anguliphantes
Anguliphantes Saaristo & Tanasevitch, 1996
 Anguliphantes angulipalpis (Westring, 1851) (type species) — Palearctic
 Anguliphantes cerinus (L. Koch, 1879) — Russia, Kazakhstan
 Anguliphantes curvus (Tanasevitch, 1992) — Russia
 Anguliphantes dybowskii (O. P.-Cambridge, 1873) — Russia, Mongolia
 Anguliphantes karpinskii (O. P.-Cambridge, 1873) — Russia, Mongolia, China
 Anguliphantes maritimus (Tanasevitch, 1988) — Russia, China
 Anguliphantes monticola (Kulczynski, 1881) — Europe
 Anguliphantes nasus (Paik, 1965) — China, Korea
 Anguliphantes nepalensis (Tanasevitch, 1987) — India, Nepal, Pakistan
 Anguliphantes nepalensoides Tanasevitch, 2011 — India
 Anguliphantes ryvkini Tanasevitch, 2006 — Russia
 Anguliphantes sibiricus (Tanasevitch, 1986) — Russia
 Anguliphantes silli (Weiss, 1987) — Romania
 Anguliphantes tripartitus (Miller & Svaton, 1978) — Central Europe
 Anguliphantes ussuricus (Tanasevitch, 1988) — Russia
 Anguliphantes zygius (Tanasevitch, 1993) — Russia, China

Anibontes
Anibontes Chamberlin, 1924
 Anibontes longipes Chamberlin & Ivie, 1944 — USA
 Anibontes mimus Chamberlin, 1924 (type species) — USA

Annapolis
Annapolis Millidge, 1984
 Annapolis mossi (Muma, 1945) — USA

Anodoration
Anodoration Millidge, 1991
 Anodoration claviferum Millidge, 1991 (type species) — Brazil, Argentina
 Anodoration tantillum (Millidge, 1991) — Brazil

Anthrobia
Anthrobia Tellkampf, 1844
 Anthrobia acuminata (Emerton, 1913) — USA
 Anthrobia coylei Miller, 2005 — USA
 Anthrobia monmouthia Tellkampf, 1844 (type species) — USA
 Anthrobia whiteleyae Miller, 2005 — USA

Antrohyphantes
Antrohyphantes Dumitrescu, 1971
 Antrohyphantes balcanicus (Drensky, 1931) — Bulgaria
 Antrohyphantes rhodopensis (Drensky, 1931) (type species) — Eastern Europe
 Antrohyphantes sophianus (Drensky, 1931) — Bulgaria

Aperturina 
'Aperturina' Tanasevitch, 2014 - 
Aperturina paniculus Tanasevitch, 2014 - Thailand, Malaysia

Aphileta
Aphileta Hull, 1920
 Aphileta centrasiatica Eskov, 1995 — Kazakhstan
 Aphileta microtarsa (Emerton, 1882) — USA
 Aphileta misera (O. P.-Cambridge, 1882) (type species) — Holarctic

Apobrata
Apobrata Miller, 2004
 Apobrata scutila (Simon, 1894) — Philippines

Aprifrontalia
Aprifrontalia Oi, 1960
 Aprifrontalia afflata Ma & Zhu, 1991 — China
 Aprifrontalia mascula (Karsch, 1879) (type species) — Russia, Korea, Taiwan, Japan

Arachosinella
Arachosinella Denis, 1958
 Arachosinella oeroegensis Wunderlich, 1995 — Mongolia
 Arachosinella strepens Denis, 1958 (type species) — Russia, Mongolia, Central Asia, Afghanistan

Araeoncus
Araeoncus Simon, 1884
 Araeoncus altissimus Simon, 1884 — Europe to Azerbaijan
 Araeoncus anguineus (L. Koch, 1869) — Europe
 Araeoncus banias Tanasevitch, 2013 — Israel
 Araeoncus caucasicus Tanasevitch, 1987 — Russia, Iran, Central Asia
 Araeoncus clavatus Tanasevitch, 1987 — Turkey, Armenia
 Araeoncus clivifrons Deltshev, 1987 — Bulgaria
 Araeoncus convexus Tullgren, 1955 — Sweden, Estonia
 Araeoncus crassiceps (Westring, 1861) — Palearctic
 Araeoncus curvatus Tullgren, 1955 — Sweden, Estonia
 Araeoncus cypriacus Tanasevitch, 2011 — Cyprus
 Araeoncus discedens (Simon, 1881) — Spain, France, Italy
 Araeoncus dispar Tullgren, 1955 — Sweden
 Araeoncus duriusculus Caporiacco, 1935 — Karakorum
 Araeoncus etinde Bosmans & Jocque, 1983 — Cameroon
 Araeoncus femineus (Roewer, 1942) — Bioko
 Araeoncus galeriformis (Tanasevitch, 1987) — Russia, Azerbaijan
 Araeoncus gertschi Caporiacco, 1949 — Kenya
 Araeoncus hanno Simon, 1884 — Algeria
 Araeoncus humilis (Blackwall, 1841) (type species) — Palearctic, New Zealand
 Araeoncus hyalinus Song & Li, 2010 — China
 Araeoncus impolitus Holm, 1962 — Kenya
 Araeoncus longispineus Song & Li, 2010 — China
 Araeoncus longiusculus (O. P.-Cambridge, 1875) — Corsica, Sardinia, Italy
 Araeoncus macrophthalmus Miller, 1970 — Angola
 Araeoncus malawiensis Jocque, 1981 — Malawi
 Araeoncus martinae Bosmans, 1996 — Morocco, Algeria
 Araeoncus mitriformis Tanasevitch, 2008 — Iran
 Araeoncus obtusus Bosmans & Jocque, 1983 — Cameroon
 Araeoncus picturatus Holm, 1962 — Tanzania
 Araeoncus rhodes Tanasevitch, 2011 — Rhodes
 Araeoncus sicanus Brignoli, 1979 — Sicily
 Araeoncus subniger Holm, 1962 — Kenya
 Araeoncus tauricus Gnelitsa, 2005 — Bulgaria, Ukraine
 Araeoncus toubkal Bosmans, 1996 — Portugal, Morocco
 Araeoncus tuberculatus Tullgren, 1955 — Sweden
 Araeoncus vaporariorum (O. P.-Cambridge, 1875) — France, Italy
 Araeoncus victorianyanzae Berland, 1936 — Kenya, Tanzania
 Araeoncus viphyensis Jocque, 1981 — Malawi
 Araeoncus vorkutensis Tanasevitch, 1984 — Russia, Kazakhstan

Archaraeoncus
Archaraeoncus Tanasevitch, 1987
 Archaraeoncus alticola Tanasevitch, 2008 — Iran
 Archaraeoncus hebraeus Tanasevitch, 2011 — Israel
 Archaraeoncus prospiciens (Thorell, 1875) (type species) — Eastern Europe to China
 Archaraeoncus sibiricus Eskov, 1988 — Russia

Arcterigone
Arcterigone Eskov & Marusik, 1994
 Arcterigone pilifrons (L. Koch, 1879) — Russia, Canada

Arcuphantes
Arcuphantes Chamberlin & Ivie, 1943
 Arcuphantes arcuatulus (Roewer, 1942) — USA, Canada
 Arcuphantes ashifuensis (Oi, 1960) — Japan
 Arcuphantes awanus Ono & Saito, 2001 — Japan
 Arcuphantes cavaticus Chamberlin & Ivie, 1943 — USA
 Arcuphantes chiakensis Seo, 2018 — Korea
 Arcuphantes chikunii Oi, 1979 — Japan
 Arcuphantes chilboensis Seo, 2018 — Korea
 Arcuphantes chinensis Tanasevitch, 2006 — China
 Arcuphantes concheus Ono & Saito, 2001 — Japan
 Arcuphantes cruciatus Jin, Ma & Tu, 2018 — USA
 Arcuphantes curvomarginatus Ma, Marusik & Tu, 2016 -  USA 
 Arcuphantes decoratus Chamberlin & Ivie, 1943 — USA
 Arcuphantes delicatus (Chikuni, 1955) — Japan
 Arcuphantes dentatus Ma, Marusik & Tu, 2016 - USA 
 Arcuphantes digitatus Saito, 1992 — Japan
 Arcuphantes dubiosus Heimer, 1987 — Mongolia
 Arcuphantes elephantis Ono & Saito, 2001 — Japan
 Arcuphantes ephippiatus Paik, 1985 — Korea
 Arcuphantes fragilis Chamberlin & Ivie, 1943 (type species) — USA
 Arcuphantes fujiensis Yaginuma, 1972 — Japan
 Arcuphantes hamadai Oi, 1979 — Japan
 Arcuphantes hastatus Ono & Saito, 2001 — Japan
 Arcuphantes hikosanensis Saito, 1992 — Japan
 Arcuphantes hokkaidanus Saito, 1992 — Japan
 Arcuphantes iriei Saito, 1992 — Japan
 Arcuphantes juwangensis Seo, 2006 — Korea
 Arcuphantes keumsanensis Paik & Seo, 1984 — Korea
 Arcuphantes kobayashii Oi, 1979 — Japan
 Arcuphantes longiconvolutus Seo, 2018 — Korea
 Arcuphantes longipollex Seo, 2013 — Korea
 Arcuphantes longissimus Saito, 1992 — Japan
 Arcuphantes namhaensis Seo, 2006 — Korea
 Arcuphantes orbiculatus Saito, 1992 — Japan
 Arcuphantes osugiensis (Oi, 1960) — Japan
 Arcuphantes paiki Saito, 1992 — Japan
 Arcuphantes pennatoides Seo, 2018 — Korea
 Arcuphantes pennatus Paik, 1983 — Korea
 Arcuphantes pictilis Chamberlin & Ivie, 1943 — USA
 Arcuphantes potteri Chamberlin & Ivie, 1943 — USA
 Arcuphantes profundus Seo, 2013 — Korea
 Arcuphantes pulchellus Paik, 1978 — Korea
 Arcuphantes pyeongchangensis Seo, 2018 — Korea
 Arcuphantes rarus Seo, 2013 — Korea
 Arcuphantes rostratus Ono & Saito, 2001 — Japan
 Arcuphantes saragaminensis Ono & Saito, 2001 — Japan
 Arcuphantes scitulus Paik, 1974 — Korea
 Arcuphantes semiorbiculatus Jin, Ma & Tu, 2018 — USA
 Arcuphantes sylvaticus Chamberlin & Ivie, 1943 — USA
 Arcuphantes tamaensis (Oi, 1960) — Japan
 Arcuphantes trifidus Seo, 2013 — Korea
 Arcuphantes troglodytarum (Oi, 1960) — Japan
 Arcuphantes tsushimanus Ono & Saito, 2001 — Japan
 Arcuphantes uenoi Saito, 1992 — Japan
 Arcuphantes uhmi Seo & Sohn, 1997 — Korea
 Arcuphantes yamakawai (Oi, 1960) — Japan

Ascetophantes
Ascetophantes Tanasevitch & Saaristo, 2006
 Ascetophantes asceticus (Tanasevitch, 1987) — Nepal

Asemostera
Asemostera Simon, 1898
 Asemostera arcana (Millidge, 1991) — Costa Rica to Venezuela
 Asemostera daedalus Miller, 2007 — Costa Rica, Panama, Colombia
 Asemostera dianae Rodrigues & Brescovit, 2012 — Peru
 Asemostera enkidu Miller, 2007 — Colombia, Venezuela
 Asemostera involuta (Millidge, 1991) — Ecuador
 Asemostera janetae Miller, 2007 — Peru, Bolivia, Argentina
 Asemostera latithorax (Keyserling, 1886) (type species) — Brazil
 Asemostera pallida (Millidge, 1991) — Peru
 Asemostera tacuapi Rodrigues, 2007 — Brazil

Asiafroneta 
Asiafroneta Tanasevitch, 2020
 Asiafroneta atrata Tanasevitch, 2020 — Malaysia (Borneo)
 Asiafroneta pallida Tanasevitch, 2020 (type species) — Malaysia (Borneo)

Asiagone 
Asiagone Tanasevitch, 2014
 Asiagone komannai Tanasevitch, 2017 - Thailand
 Asiagone perforata Tanasevitch, 2014 - China, Laos 
 Asiagone siama Tanasevitch, 2014  - Thailand 
 Asiagone signifera Tanasevitch, 2014 (type species) - Laos

Asiceratinops
Asiceratinops Eskov, 1992
 Asiceratinops amurensis (Eskov, 1992) (type species) — Russia
 Asiceratinops kolymensis (Eskov, 1992) — Russia

Asiophantes
Asiophantes Eskov, 1993
 Asiophantes pacificus Eskov, 1993 (type species) — Russia
 Asiophantes sibiricus Eskov, 1993 — Russia

Asperthorax
Asperthorax Oi, 1960
 Asperthorax borealis Ono & Saito, 2001 — Russia, Japan
 Asperthorax communis Oi, 1960 (type species) — Russia, Japan
 Asperthorax granularis Gao & Zhu, 1989 — China

Asthenargellus
Asthenargellus Caporiacco, 1949
 Asthenargellus kastoni Caporiacco, 1949 (type species) — Kenya
 Asthenargellus meneghettii Caporiacco, 1949 — Kenya

Asthenargoides
Asthenargoides Eskov, 1993
 Asthenargoides kurenstchikovi Eskov, 1993 — Russia
 Asthenargoides kurtchevae Eskov, 1993 — Russia
 Asthenargoides logunovi Eskov, 1993 (type species) — Russia

Asthenargus
Asthenargus Simon & Fage, 1922
 Asthenargus adygeicus Tanasevitch, Ponomarev & Chumachenko, 2016 -  Russia (Caucasus) 
 Asthenargus bracianus Miller, 1938 — Central, Eastern Europe
 Asthenargus brevisetosus Miller, 1970 — Angola
 Asthenargus carpaticus Weiss, 1998 — Romania
 Asthenargus caucasicus Tanasevitch, 1987 — Russia, Central Asia
 Asthenargus conicus Tanasevitch, 2006 — China
 Asthenargus edentulus Tanasevitch, 1989 — Kazakhstan to China
 Asthenargus expallidus Holm, 1962 — Cameroon, Congo, Kenya, Tanzania
 Asthenargus helveticus Schenkel, 1936 — Switzerland to Poland
 Asthenargus inermis Simon & Fage, 1922 — East Africa
 Asthenargus linguatulus Miller, 1970 — Angola
 Asthenargus longispinus (Simon, 1914) — Spain, France
 Asthenargus major Holm, 1962 — Kenya
 Asthenargus marginatus Holm, 1962 — Uganda
 Asthenargus matsudae Saito & Ono, 2001 — Japan
 Asthenargus myrmecophilus Miller, 1970 — Angola, Nigeria
 Asthenargus niphonius Saito & Ono, 2001 — Japan
 Asthenargus paganus (Simon, 1884) (type species) — Palearctic
 Asthenargus perforatus Schenkel, 1929 — Europe
 Asthenargus placidus (Simon, 1884) — France, Switzerland
 Asthenargus thaleri Wunderlich, 1983 — Nepal

Atypena
Atypena Simon, 1894
Atypena adelinae Barrion & Litsinger, 1995 – Philippines
Atypena cirrifrons (Heimer, 1984) – China, Laos, Thailand, Vietnam
Atypena cracatoa (Millidge, 1995) – Krakatau
Atypena ellioti Jocqué, 1983 – Sri Lanka
Atypena pallida (Millidge, 1995) – Thailand
Atypena simoni Jocqué, 1983 – Sri Lanka
Atypena superciliosa Simon, 1894T (type species) – Philippines
Atypena thailandica Barrion & Litsinger, 1995 – Thailand

Australolinyphia
Australolinyphia Wunderlich, 1976
 Australolinyphia remota Wunderlich, 1976 — Queensland

Australophantes
Australophantes Tanasevitch, 2012
 Australophantes laetesiformis (Wunderlich), 1976 — Sulawesi, Queensland

Bactrogyna
Bactrogyna Millidge, 1991
 Bactrogyna prominens Millidge, 1991 — Chile

Baryphyma
Baryphyma Simon, 1884
 Baryphyma gowerense (Locket, 1965) — Holarctic
 Baryphyma insigne (Palmgren, 1976) — Finland
 Baryphyma maritimum (Crocker & Parker, 1970) — Europe to Central Asia
 Baryphyma pratense (Blackwall, 1861) (type species) — Europe to Belarus
 Baryphyma proclive (Simon, 1884) — Italy
 Baryphyma trifrons (O. P.-Cambridge, 1863) — Holarctic

Baryphymula
Baryphymula Eskov, 1992
 Baryphymula kamakuraensis (Oi, 1960) — Japan

Bathylinyphia
Bathylinyphia Eskov, 1992
 Bathylinyphia maior (Kulczynski, 1885) — Russia, Kazakhstan, China, Korea, Japan

Bathyphantes
Bathyphantes Menge, 1866
 Bathyphantes alameda Ivie, 1969 — USA, Canada
 Bathyphantes alascensis (Banks, 1900) — USA, Canada, Alaska
 Bathyphantes alboventris (Banks, 1892) — USA, Canada
 Bathyphantes approximatus (O. P.-Cambridge, 1871) — Palearctic
 Bathyphantes bishopi Ivie, 1969 — USA
 Bathyphantes bohuensis Zhu & Zhou, 1983 — China
 Bathyphantes brevipes (Emerton, 1917) — USA, Canada, Alaska
 Bathyphantes brevis (Emerton, 1911) — USA, Canada, Alaska
 Bathyphantes canadensis (Emerton, 1882) — Russia, Alaska, Canada, USA
 Bathyphantes chico Ivie, 1969 — USA
 Bathyphantes diasosnemis Fage, 1929 — USA
 Bathyphantes dubius Locket, 1968 — Angola
 Bathyphantes eumenis (L. Koch, 1879) — Holarctic
 Bathyphantes eumenis buchari Ruzicka, 1988 — Central Europe
 Bathyphantes fissidens Simon, 1902 — Argentina
 Bathyphantes floralis Tu & Li, 2006 — Vietnam
 Bathyphantes glacialis Caporiacco, 1935 — Karakorum
 Bathyphantes gracilipes van Helsdingen, 1977 — St. Helena
 Bathyphantes gracilis (Blackwall, 1841) (type species) — Holarctic
 Bathyphantes gulkana Ivie, 1969 — Russia, Alaska
 Bathyphantes helenae van Helsdingen, 1977 — St. Helena
 Bathyphantes hirsutus Locket, 1968 — Congo
 Bathyphantes humilis (L. Koch, 1879) — Russia
 Bathyphantes iviei Holm, 1970 — Alaska
 Bathyphantes jeniseicus Eskov, 1979 — Finland, Russia
 Bathyphantes keeni (Emerton, 1917) — Alaska, Canada, USA
 Bathyphantes larvarum Caporiacco, 1935 — Karakorum
 Bathyphantes latescens (Chamberlin, 1919) — USA
 Bathyphantes lennoxensis Simon, 1902 — Argentina
 Bathyphantes mainlingensis Hu, 2001 — China
 Bathyphantes malkini Ivie, 1969 — USA, Canada
 Bathyphantes menyuanensis Hu, 2001 — China
 Bathyphantes minor Millidge & Russell-Smith, 1992 — Borneo
 Bathyphantes montanus Rainbow, 1912 — Queensland
 Bathyphantes nangqianensis Hu, 2001 — China
 Bathyphantes nigrinus (Westring, 1851) — Palearctic
 Bathyphantes ohlerti Simon, 1884 — Poland
 Bathyphantes orica Ivie, 1969 — USA, Canada
 Bathyphantes pallidus (Banks, 1892) — USA, Canada, Alaska
 Bathyphantes paracymbialis Tanasevitch, 2014 -  China, Laos, Thailand, Malaysia 
 Bathyphantes paradoxus Berland, 1929 — Samoa
 Bathyphantes parvulus (Westring, 1851) — Palearctic
 Bathyphantes pogonias Kulczynski, 1885 — Russia, Alaska
 Bathyphantes rainbowi Roewer, 1942 — Lord Howe Islands
 Bathyphantes reprobus (Kulczynski, 1916) — Holarctic
 Bathyphantes reticularis Caporiacco, 1935 — Karakorum
 Bathyphantes robustus Oi, 1960 — Korea, Japan
 Bathyphantes sarasini Berland, 1924 — New Caledonia
 Bathyphantes setiger F. O. P.-Cambridge, 1894 — Palearctic
 Bathyphantes similis Kulczynski, 1894 — Europe, Turkey
 Bathyphantes tagalogensis Barrion & Litsinger, 1995 — Philippines
 Bathyphantes tongluensis Chen & Song, 1988 — China
 Bathyphantes umiatus Ivie, 1969 — Alaska
 Bathyphantes vittiger Simon, 1884 — France
 Bathyphantes waneta Ivie, 1969 — USA, Canada
 Bathyphantes weyeri (Emerton, 1875) — USA
 Bathyphantes yodoensis Oi, 1960 — Japan
 Bathyphantes yukon Ivie, 1969 — Alaska

Batueta
Batueta Locket, 1982
 Batueta baculum Tanasevitch, 2014 -   Thailand, Malaysia 
 Batueta cuspidata Zhao & Li, 2014 - China 
 Batueta similis Wunderlich & Song, 1995 — China
 Batueta voluta Locket, 1982 (type species) — Malaysia

Bifurcia
Bifurcia Saaristo, Tu & Li, 2006
 Bifurcia cucurbita Zhai & Zhu, 2007 — China
 Bifurcia curvata (Sha & Zhu, 1987) — China
 Bifurcia maritima (Tanasevitch, 2010) -  Russia (Far East) 
 Bifurcia oligerae Marusik, Omelko & Koponen, 2016 -  Russia (Far East) 
 Bifurcia pseudosongi Quan & Chen, 2012 — China
 Bifurcia ramosa (Li & Zhu, 1987) (type species) — China
 Bifurcia songi Zhai & Zhu, 2007 — China
 Bifurcia tanasevitchi Marusik, Omelko & Koponen, 2016 -  Russia (Far East)

Birgerius
Birgerius Saaristo, 1973
 Birgerius microps (Simon, 1911) — France, Spain

Bisetifer
Bisetifer Tanasevitch, 1987
 Bisetifer cephalotus Tanasevitch, 1987 (type species) — Russia, Central Asia
 Bisetifer gruzin Tanasevitch, Ponomarev & Chumachenko, 2015 - Russia, Georgia, Azerbaijan

Bishopiana
Bishopiana Eskov, 1988
 Bishopiana glumacea (Gao, Fei & Zhu, 1992) — China
 Bishopiana hypoarctica Eskov, 1988 (type species) — Russia

Blestia
Blestia Millidge, 1993
 Blestia sarcocuon (Crosby & Bishop, 1927) — USA

Bolephthyphantes
Bolephthyphantes Strand, 1901
 Bolephthyphantes caucasicus (Tanasevitch, 1990) — Czech Republic, Russia
 Bolephthyphantes index (Thorell, 1856) (type species) — Greenland, Palearctic
 Bolephthyphantes indexoides (Tanasevitch, 1989) — Central Asia

Bolyphantes
Bolyphantes C. L. Koch, 1837
 Bolyphantes alticeps (Sundevall, 1833) — Palearctic
 Bolyphantes bipartitus (Tanasevitch, 1989) — Kyrgyzstan
 Bolyphantes distichoides Tanasevitch, 2000 — Russia
 Bolyphantes distichus (Tanasevitch, 1986) — Russia, Kazakhstan
 Bolyphantes elburzensis Tanasevitch, 2009 — Iran
 Bolyphantes kilpisjaerviensis Palmgren, 1975 — Finland
 Bolyphantes kolosvaryi (Caporiacco, 1936) — Switzerland, Italy, Balkans
 Bolyphantes lagodekhensis (Tanasevitch, 1990) — Georgia
 Bolyphantes lamellaris Tanasevitch, 1990 — Italy, Greece, Russia
 Bolyphantes luteolus (Blackwall, 1833) (type species) — Palearctic
 Bolyphantes mongolicus Loksa, 1965 — Mongolia
 Bolyphantes nigropictus Simon, 1884 — Western Mediterranean
 Bolyphantes punctulatus (Holm, 1939) — Scandinavia, Russia
 Bolyphantes sacer (Tanasevitch, 1986) — Kyrgyzstan
 Bolyphantes severtzovi Tanasevitch, 1989 — Central Asia
 Bolyphantes subtiliseta Tanasevitch, 2019 — France (Corsica)
 Bolyphantes supremus (Tanasevitch, 1986) — Kyrgyzstan

Bordea
Bordea Bosmans, 1995
 Bordea berlandi (Fage, 1931) — Portugal
 Bordea cavicola (Simon, 1884) (type species) — Spain, France
 Bordea negrei (Dresco, 1951) — Spain, France

Brachycerasphora
Brachycerasphora Denis, 1962
 Brachycerasphora connectens Denis, 1964 — Libya
 Brachycerasphora convexa (Simon, 1884) — Algeria, Tunisia
 Brachycerasphora femoralis (O. P.-Cambridge, 1872) — Israel
 Brachycerasphora monocerotum Denis, 1962 (type species) — Libya
 Brachycerasphora parvicornis (Simon, 1884) — Egypt

Bursellia
Bursellia Holm, 1962
 Bursellia cameroonensis Bosmans & Jocque, 1983 — Cameroon
 Bursellia comata Holm, 1962 — Congo, Uganda
 Bursellia comata kivuensis Holm, 1964 — Congo
 Bursellia gibbicervix (Denis, 1962) — Tanzania
 Bursellia glabra Holm, 1962 (type species) — Congo, Kenya
 Bursellia holmi Bosmans, 1977 — Kenya
 Bursellia paghi Jocque & Scharff, 1986 — Tanzania
 Bursellia setifera (Denis, 1962) — Cameroon, Congo, Kenya, Tanzania, Malawi
 Bursellia unicornis Bosmans, 1988 — Cameroon

Caenonetria
Caenonetria Millidge & Russell-Smith, 1992
 Caenonetria perdita Millidge & Russell-Smith, 1992 — Borneo

Callitrichia
Callitrichia Fage, 1936
 Callitrichia afromontana Scharff, 1990 — Tanzania
 Callitrichia aliena Holm, 1962 — Algeria, Cameroon, Kenya
 Callitrichia cacuminata Holm, 1962 — Kenya, Uganda
 Callitrichia crinigera Scharff, 1990 — Tanzania
 Callitrichia formosana Oi, 1977 — Bangladesh to Japan
 Callitrichia glabriceps Holm, 1962 — Kenya, Uganda
 Callitrichia hamifera Fage, 1936 (type species) — Kenya, Uganda
 Callitrichia inacuminata Bosmans, 1977 — Kenya
 Callitrichia incerta Miller, 1970 — Angola
 Callitrichia kenyae Fage, 1936 — Kenya
 Callitrichia marakweti Fage, 1936 — Kenya
 Callitrichia meruensis Holm, 1962 — Tanzania
 Callitrichia mira (Jocque & Scharff, 1986) — Tanzania
 Callitrichia monticola (Tullgren, 1910) — Tanzania
 Callitrichia obtusifrons Miller, 1970 — Angola
 Callitrichia paludicola Holm, 1962 — Tanzania
 Callitrichia pileata (Jocque & Scharff, 1986) — Tanzania
 Callitrichia pilosa (Jocque & Scharff, 1986) — Tanzania
 Callitrichia ruwenzoriensis Holm, 1962 — Uganda
 Callitrichia sellafrontis Scharff, 1990 — Tanzania
 Callitrichia silvatica Holm, 1962 — Kenya, Uganda, Malawi
 Callitrichia simplex (Jocque & Scharff, 1986) — Tanzania
 Callitrichia taeniata Holm, 1968 — Tanzania
 Callitrichia turrita Holm, 1962 — Tanzania

Callosa
Callosa Zhao & Li, 2017
 Callosa baiseensis Zhao & Li, 2017 — China
 Callosa ciliata Zhao & Li, 2017 — China

Camafroneta
Camafroneta Frick & Scharff, 2018
 Camafroneta oku Frick & Scharff, 2018 — Cameroon

Cameroneta
Cameroneta Bosmans & Jocque, 1983
 Cameroneta longiradix Bosmans & Jocque, 1983 — Cameroon

Canariellanum
Canariellanum Wunderlich, 1987
 Canariellanum albidum Wunderlich, 1987 — Canary Islands
 Canariellanum arborense Wunderlich, 1987 (type species) — Canary Islands
 Canariellanum hierroense Wunderlich, 1992 — Canary Islands
 Canariellanum palmense Wunderlich, 1987 — Canary Islands

Canariphantes
Canariphantes Wunderlich, 1992
 Canariphantes acoreensis (Wunderlich, 1992) - Azores 
 Canariphantes alpicola Wunderlich, 1992 type species — Canary Islands
 Canariphantes atlassahariensis (Bosmans, 1991) — Algeria
 Canariphantes epigynatus Tanasevitch, 2013 — Israel
 Canariphantes junipericola Crespo & Bosmans, 2014 
 Canariphantes naili (Bosmans & Bouragba, 1992) — Algeria
 Canariphantes nanus (Kulczynski, 1898) — Central, Eastern Europe, Ukraine, Russia, Israel
 Canariphantes palmaensis Wunderlich, 2011 — Canary Islands
 Canariphantes relictus Crespo & Bosmans, 2014 - Azores 
 Canariphantes tenerrimus (Simon, 1929) -  Portugal, Spain, France, Greece, Algeria, Morocco 
 Canariphantes zonatus (Simon, 1884) — Portugal, France, Algeria, Morocco, Tunisia
 Canariphantes zonatus lucifugus (Simon, 1929) — France

Capsulia
Capsulia Saaristo, Tu & Li, 2006
 Capsulia laciniosa Zhao & Li, 2014 -  China 
 Capsulia tianmushana (Chen & Song, 1987) (type species)  — China

Caracladus
Caracladus Simon, 1884
 Caracladus avicula (L. Koch, 1869) (type species) — France, Switzerland, Germany, Austria, Italy
 Caracladus leberti (Roewer, 1942) — Western, Central Europe
 Caracladus montanus Sha & Zhu, 1994 — China
 Caracladus tsurusakii Saito, 1988 — Japan
 Caracladus zamoniensis Frick & Muff, 2009 — France, Switzerland, Austria

Carorita
Carorita Duffey & Merrett, 1963
 Carorita limnaea (Crosby & Bishop, 1927) (type species) — Holarctic
 Carorita sibirica Tanasevitch, 2007 — Russia

Cassafroneta
Cassafroneta Blest, 1979
 Cassafroneta forsteri Blest, 1979 — New Zealand

Catacercus
Catacercus Millidge, 1985
 Catacercus fuegianus (Tullgren, 1901) — Chile

Catonetria
Catonetria Millidge & Ashmole, 1994
 Catonetria caeca Millidge & Ashmole, 1994 — Ascension Islands

Caucasopisthes
Caucasopisthes Tanasevitch, 1990
 Caucasopisthes procurvus (Tanasevitch, 1987) — Russia, Georgia

Cautinella
Cautinella Millidge, 1985
 Cautinella minuta Millidge, 1985 — Chile

Caviphantes
Caviphantes Oi, 1960
 Caviphantes dobrogicus (Dumitrescu & Miller, 1962) — Romania to Central Asia
 Caviphantes flagellatus (Zhu & Zhou, 1992) — China
 Caviphantes pseudosaxetorum Wunderlich, 1979 — Lebanon to India, Nepal, China, Russia, Japan
 Caviphantes samensis Oi, 1960 (type species) — China, Japan
 Caviphantes saxetorum (Hull, 1916) — Holarctic

Centromerita
Centromerita Dahl, 1912
 Centromerita bicolor (Blackwall, 1833) (type species) — Palearctic, Canada
 Centromerita concinna (Thorell, 1875) — Palearctic

Centromerus
Centromerus Dahl, 1886
 Centromerus abditus Gnelitsa, 2007 — Ukraine, Russia
 Centromerus acutidentatus Deltshev, 2002 — Yugoslavia
 Centromerus albidus Simon, 1929 — Europe
 Centromerus amurensis Eskov & Marusik, 1992 — Russia
 Centromerus andrei Dresco, 1952 — Spain
 Centromerus andriescui Weiss, 1987 — Romania
 Centromerus anoculus Wunderlich, 1995 — Madeira
 Centromerus arcanus (O. P.-Cambridge, 1873) — Palearctic
 Centromerus balazuci Dresco, 1952 — France
 Centromerus bonaeviae Brignoli, 1979 — Sardinia
 Centromerus brevipalpus (Menge, 1866) (type species) — Palearctic
 Centromerus bulgarianus (Drensky, 1931) — Bulgaria
 Centromerus capucinus (Simon, 1884) — Europe, Russia
 Centromerus cavernarum (L. Koch, 1872) — Europe
 Centromerus chappuisi Fage, 1931 — Romania
 Centromerus cinctus (Simon, 1884) — Corsica, Algeria, Tunisia
 Centromerus clarus (L. Koch, 1879) — Russia
 Centromerus cornupalpis (O. P.-Cambridge, 1875) — USA, Canada
 Centromerus corsicus (Simon, 1910) -  Corsica 
 Centromerus cottarellii Brignoli, 1979 — Italy
 Centromerus dacicus Dumitrescu & Georgescu, 1980 — Romania, Serbia
 Centromerus denticulatus (Emerton, 1909) — USA
 Centromerus desmeti Bosmans, 1986 — Morocco, Algeria
 Centromerus dilutus (O. P.-Cambridge, 1875) — Europe, Russia
 Centromerus europaeus (Simon, 1911) — Portugal, Spain, France, Algeria, Balkans
 Centromerus fuerteventurensis Wunderlich, 1992 — Canary Islands
 Centromerus furcatus (Emerton, 1882) — USA, Canada
 Centromerus gatoi Ballarin & Pantini, 2020 — Italy
 Centromerus gentilis Dumitrescu & Georgescu, 1980 — Romania
 Centromerus hanseni Ballarin & Pantini, 2020 — Italy
 Centromerus ictericus (Simon, 1929) -  France 
 Centromerus incilium (L. Koch, 1881) — Palearctic
 Centromerus isaiai Bosmans, 2015 - Corsica, Sardinia 
 Centromerus lakatnikensis (Drensky, 1931) — Bulgaria
 Centromerus latidens (Emerton, 1882) — USA, Canada
 Centromerus laziensis Hu, 2001 — China
 Centromerus leruthi Fage, 1933 — Europe
 Centromerus levitarsis (Simon, 1884) — Palearctic
 Centromerus longibulbus (Emerton, 1882) — USA
 Centromerus marciai Bosmans & Gasparo, 2015 - Sardinia
 Centromerus milleri Deltshev, 1974 — Bulgaria
 Centromerus minor Tanasevitch, 1990 — Turkey, Russia, Central Asia
 Centromerus minutissimus Merrett & Powell, 1993 — England, Germany
 Centromerus nurgush Tanasevitch & Esyunin, 2013 — Russia
 Centromerus obenbergeri Kratochvil & Miller, 1938 — Montenegro
 Centromerus obscurus Bösenberg, 1902 — Central Europe
 Centromerus pabulator (O. P.-Cambridge, 1875) — Europe, Russia
 Centromerus pacificus Eskov & Marusik, 1992 — Russia
 Centromerus paradoxus (Simon, 1884) — Western Mediterranean
 Centromerus pasquinii Brignoli, 1971 — Italy
 Centromerus persimilis (O. P.-Cambridge, 1912) — Europe, Russia
 Centromerus persolutus (O. P.-Cambridge, 1875) — USA, Canada
 Centromerus phoceorum Simon, 1929 — Portugal, Spain, France, Algeria, Tunisia
 Centromerus piccolo Weiss, 1996 — Germany
 Centromerus ponsi Lissner, 2016 - Spain (Balearic Isles) 
 Centromerus pratensis Gnelitsa & Ponomarev, 2010 — Russia
 Centromerus prudens (O. P.-Cambridge, 1873) — Palearctic
 Centromerus prudens electus (Simon, 1884) — France
 Centromerus puddui Brignoli, 1979 — Sardinia
 Centromerus qinghaiensis Hu, 2001 — China
 Centromerus qingzangensis Hu, 2001 — China
 Centromerus remotus Roewer, 1938 — Moluccas
 Centromerus satyrus (Simon, 1884) — France
 Centromerus sellarius (Simon, 1884) — Europe
 Centromerus semiater (L. Koch, 1879) — Palearctic
 Centromerus serbicus Deltshev, 2002 — Yugoslavia
 Centromerus serratus (O. P.-Cambridge, 1875) — Europe
 Centromerus setosus Miller & Kratochvil, 1940 — Slovakia
 Centromerus sexoculatus Wunderlich, 1992 — Madeira
 Centromerus silvicola (Kulczynski, 1887) — Central Europe to Russia
 Centromerus sinuatus Bosmans, 1986 — Morocco, Algeria, Tunisia
 Centromerus sinus (Simon, 1884) — France
 Centromerus subalpinus Lessert, 1907 — Switzerland, Germany, Austria
 Centromerus subcaecus Kulczynski, 1914 — Europe
 Centromerus succinus (Simon, 1884) — Western Mediterranean
 Centromerus sylvaticus (Blackwall, 1841) — Holarctic
 Centromerus sylvaticus paucidentatus Deltshev, 1983 — Bulgaria
 Centromerus tennapex (Barrows, 1940) — USA
 Centromerus terrigenus Yaginuma, 1972 — Russia, Japan
 Centromerus timidus (Simon, 1884) — Spain, Romania
 Centromerus tongiorgii Ballarin & Pantini, 2020 — Italy
 Centromerus tridentinus Caporiacco, 1952 — Italy
 Centromerus trilobus Tao, Li & Zhu, 1995 — China
 Centromerus truki Millidge, 1991 — Caroline Islands
 Centromerus turcicus Wunderlich, 1995 — Turkey
 Centromerus unicolor Roewer, 1959 — Turkey
 Centromerus ussuricus Eskov & Marusik, 1992 — Russia
 Centromerus valkanovi Deltshev, 1983 — Bulgaria
 Centromerus variegatus Denis, 1962 — Madeira

Centrophantes
Centrophantes Miller & Polenec, 1975
 Centrophantes crosbyi (Fage & Kratochvil, 1933) (type species) — Europe
 Centrophantes roeweri (Wiehle, 1961) — Central Europe

Ceraticelus
Ceraticelus Simon, 1884
 Ceraticelus agathus Chamberlin, 1949 — USA
 Ceraticelus albus (Fox, 1891) — USA
 Ceraticelus alticeps (Fox, 1891) — USA
 Ceraticelus artemisiae Prentice & Redak, 2009 — USA
 Ceraticelus atriceps (O. P.-Cambridge, 1874) — USA
 Ceraticelus berthoudi Dondale, 1958 — USA
 Ceraticelus bryantae Kaston, 1945 — USA
 Ceraticelus bulbosus (Emerton, 1882) — Holarctic
 Ceraticelus carinatus (Emerton, 1911) — USA
 Ceraticelus crassiceps Chamberlin & Ivie, 1939 — USA
 Ceraticelus creolus Chamberlin, 1925 — USA
 Ceraticelus emertoni (O. P.-Cambridge, 1874) — USA
 Ceraticelus fastidiosus Crosby & Bishop, 1925 — USA
 Ceraticelus fissiceps (O. P.-Cambridge, 1874) (type species) — USA, Canada
 Ceraticelus innominabilis Crosby, 1905 — Alaska
 Ceraticelus laetabilis (O. P.-Cambridge, 1874) — USA, Canada
 Ceraticelus laetabilis pisga Chamberlin, 1949 — USA
 Ceraticelus laetus (O. P.-Cambridge, 1874) — USA, Canada
 Ceraticelus laticeps (Emerton, 1894) — USA, Canada
 Ceraticelus laticeps bucephalus Chamberlin & Ivie, 1944 — USA
 Ceraticelus limnologicus Crosby & Bishop, 1925 — USA
 Ceraticelus micropalpis (Emerton, 1882) — USA
 Ceraticelus minutus (Emerton, 1882) — USA, Canada
 Ceraticelus nigripes Bryant, 1940 — Cuba
 Ceraticelus orientalis Eskov, 1987 — Russia
 Ceraticelus paludigena Crosby & Bishop, 1925 — USA, Hispaniola
 Ceraticelus paschalis Crosby & Bishop, 1925 — USA
 Ceraticelus phylax Ivie & Barrows, 1935 — USA
 Ceraticelus pygmaeus (Emerton, 1882) — USA
 Ceraticelus rowensis Levi & Levi, 1955 — Canada
 Ceraticelus savannus Chamberlin & Ivie, 1944 — USA
 Ceraticelus silus Dondale, 1958 — Alaska
 Ceraticelus similis (Banks, 1892) — USA
 Ceraticelus subniger Chamberlin, 1949 — USA
 Ceraticelus tibialis (Fox, 1891) — USA
 Ceraticelus tumidus Bryant, 1940 — Cuba

Ceratinella
Ceratinella Emerton, 1882
 Ceratinella acerea Chamberlin & Ivie, 1933 — USA
 Ceratinella alaskae Chamberlin & Ivie, 1947 — Russia, Alaska, Canada, USA
 Ceratinella apollonii Caporiacco, 1938 — Italy
 Ceratinella brevipes (Westring, 1851) — Palearctic
 Ceratinella brevis (Wider, 1834) (type species) — Palearctic
 Ceratinella brunnea Emerton, 1882 — USA, Canada, Alaska
 Ceratinella buna Chamberlin, 1949 — USA
 Ceratinella diversa Chamberlin, 1949 — USA
 Ceratinella fumifera Saito, 1939 — Japan
 Ceratinella hemetha Chamberlin, 1949 — USA
 Ceratinella holocerea Chamberlin, 1949 — USA
 Ceratinella kenaba Chamberlin, 1949 — USA
 Ceratinella kurenshchikovi Marusik & Gnelitsa, 2009 — Russia
 Ceratinella major Kulczynski, 1894 — Palearctic
 Ceratinella ornatula (Crosby & Bishop, 1925) — USA, Canada, Alaska, Greenland
 Ceratinella ornatula alaskana Chamberlin, 1949 — Alaska
 Ceratinella parvula (Fox, 1891) — USA
 Ceratinella plancyi (Simon, 1880) — China
 Ceratinella playa Cokendolpher et al., 2007 — USA
 Ceratinella rosea Oliger, 1985 — Russia
 Ceratinella scabrosa (O. P.-Cambridge, 1871) — Palearctic
 Ceratinella sibirica Strand, 1903 — Russia
 Ceratinella subulata Bösenberg & Strand, 1906 — Japan
 Ceratinella sydneyensis Wunderlich, 1976 — New South Wales
 Ceratinella tigana Chamberlin, 1949 — Alaska
 Ceratinella tosior Chamberlin, 1949 — USA
 Ceratinella wideri (Thorell, 1871) — Palearctic

Ceratinops
Ceratinops Banks, 1905
 Ceratinops annulipes (Banks, 1892) (type species) — USA
 Ceratinops carolinus (Banks, 1911) — USA
 Ceratinops crenatus (Emerton, 1882) — USA
 Ceratinops inflatus (Emerton, 1923) — USA
 Ceratinops latus (Emerton, 1882) — USA
 Ceratinops littoralis (Emerton, 1913) — USA
 Ceratinops obscurus (Chamberlin & Ivie, 1939) — USA
 Ceratinops rugosus (Emerton, 1909) — USA
 Ceratinops sylvaticus (Emerton, 1913) — USA, Canada
 Ceratinops uintanus Chamberlin, 1949 — USA

Ceratinopsidis
Ceratinopsidis Bishop & Crosby, 1930
 Ceratinopsidis formosa (Banks, 1892) — USA

Ceratinopsis
Ceratinopsis Emerton, 1882
 Ceratinopsis acripes (Denis, 1962) — Madeira
 Ceratinopsis africana (Holm, 1962) — Gabon, Kenya
 Ceratinopsis atolma Chamberlin, 1925 — USA
 Ceratinopsis auriculata Emerton, 1909 — USA, Canada
 Ceratinopsis benoiti (Holm, 1968) — Tanzania
 Ceratinopsis bicolor Banks, 1896 — USA
 Ceratinopsis blesti Locket, 1982 — Malaysia
 Ceratinopsis bona Chamberlin & Ivie, 1944 — USA
 Ceratinopsis crosbyi Chamberlin, 1949 — USA
 Ceratinopsis delicata Chamberlin & Ivie, 1939 — USA
 Ceratinopsis dippenaari Jocque, 1984 — South Africa
 Ceratinopsis disparata (Dondale, 1959) — USA
 Ceratinopsis fako Bosmans & Jocque, 1983 — Cameroon
 Ceratinopsis georgiana Chamberlin & Ivie, 1944 — USA
 Ceratinopsis gosibia Chamberlin, 1949 — USA
 Ceratinopsis guerrerensis Gertsch & Davis, 1937 — Mexico
 Ceratinopsis holmi Jocque, 1981 — Malawi, Tanzania
 Ceratinopsis idanrensis Locket & Russell-Smith, 1980 — Nigeria, Botswana
 Ceratinopsis infuscata (Denis, 1962) — Madeira
 Ceratinopsis interpres (O. P.-Cambridge, 1874) (type species) — USA
 Ceratinopsis interventa Chamberlin, 1949 — USA
 Ceratinopsis labradorensis Emerton, 1925 — Canada
 Ceratinopsis laticeps Emerton, 1882 — USA
 Ceratinopsis locketi Millidge, 1995 — Krakatau
 Ceratinopsis machadoi (Miller, 1970) — Nigeria, Angola
 Ceratinopsis mbamensis Bosmans, 1988 — Cameroon
 Ceratinopsis monticola (Simon, 1894) — Sri Lanka
 Ceratinopsis munda (O. P.-Cambridge, 1896) — Guatemala
 Ceratinopsis nigriceps Emerton, 1882 — USA, Canada
 Ceratinopsis nigripalpis Emerton, 1882 — USA, Canada
 Ceratinopsis nitida (Holm, 1964) — Cameroon, Congo
 Ceratinopsis oregonicola Chamberlin, 1949 — USA
 Ceratinopsis orientalis Locket, 1982 — Malaysia
 Ceratinopsis palomara Chamberlin, 1949 — USA
 Ceratinopsis raboeli Scharff, 1989 — Kenya
 Ceratinopsis rosea Banks, 1898 — Mexico
 Ceratinopsis ruberrima Franganillo, 1926 — Cuba
 Ceratinopsis secuta Chamberlin, 1949 — USA
 Ceratinopsis setoensis (Oi, 1960) — Korea, Japan
 Ceratinopsis sinuata Bosmans, 1988 — Cameroon
 Ceratinopsis sutoris Bishop & Crosby, 1930 — USA, Canada
 Ceratinopsis swanea Chamberlin & Ivie, 1944 — USA
 Ceratinopsis sylvania Chamberlin & Ivie, 1944 — USA
 Ceratinopsis watsinga Chamberlin, 1949 — USA
 Ceratinopsis xanthippe (Keyserling, 1886) — USA
 Ceratinopsis yola Chamberlin & Ivie, 1939 — USA

Ceratocyba
Ceratocyba Holm, 1962
 Ceratocyba umbilicaris Holm, 1962 — Kenya

Cheniseo
Cheniseo Bishop & Crosby, 1935
 Cheniseo fabulosa Bishop & Crosby, 1935 (type species) — USA
 Cheniseo faceta Bishop & Crosby, 1935 — USA
 Cheniseo recurvata (Banks, 1900) — Alaska
 Cheniseo sphagnicultor Bishop & Crosby, 1935 — USA, Canada

Chenisides
Chenisides Denis, 1962
 Chenisides bispinigera Denis, 1962 (type species) — Congo
 Chenisides monospina Russell-Smith & Jocque, 1986 — Kenya

Cherserigone
Cherserigone Denis, 1954
 Cherserigone gracilipes Denis, 1954 — Algeria

Chiangmaia
Chiangmaia Millidge, 1995
 Chiangmaia rufula Millidge, 1995 — Thailand
 Chiangmaia sawetamali Millidge, 1995 (type species) — Thailand

Chthiononetes
Chthiononetes Millidge, 1993
 Chthiononetes tenuis Millidge, 1993 — Western Australia

Cinetata
Cinetata Wunderlich, 1995
 Cinetata gradata (Simon, 1881) — Europe

Cirrosus 
Cirrosus Zhao & Li, 2014
 Cirrosus atrocaudatus Zhao & Li, 2014  -  China

Claviphantes
Claviphantes Tanasevitch & Saaristo, 2006
 Claviphantes bifurcatoides (Tanasevitch, 1987) — Nepal
 Claviphantes bifurcatus (Tanasevitch, 1987) (type species) — Nepal

Cnephalocotes
Cnephalocotes Simon, 1884
 Cnephalocotes ferrugineus Seo, 2018 — Korea
 Cnephalocotes obscurus (Blackwall, 1834) (type species) — Palearctic
 Cnephalocotes simpliciceps Simon, 1900 — Hawaii
 Cnephalocotes tristis Denis, 1954 — France

Collinsia
Collinsia O. P.-Cambridge, 1913
 Collinsia borea (L. Koch, 1879) — Russia, Alaska
 Collinsia caliginosa (L. Koch, 1879) — Russia, Central Asia
 Collinsia caliginosa nemenziana Thaler, 1980 — Austria
 Collinsia clypiella (Chamberlin, 1920) — USA
 Collinsia crassipalpis (Caporiacco, 1935) — India
 Collinsia dentata Eskov, 1990 — Russia
 Collinsia despaxi (Denis, 1950) — France
 Collinsia distincta (Simon, 1884) (type species) — Palearctic
 Collinsia ezoensis (Saito, 1986) — Japan
 Collinsia hibernica (Simon, 1926) — France
 Collinsia holmgreni (Thorell, 1871) — Holarctic
 Collinsia holmi Eskov, 1990 — Russia
 Collinsia inerrans (O. P.-Cambridge, 1885) — Palearctic
 Collinsia ksenia (Crosby & Bishop, 1928) — USA, Canada, Alaska
 Collinsia oatimpa (Chamberlin, 1949) — USA
 Collinsia oxypaederotipus (Crosby, 1905) — USA
 Collinsia palmeni Hackman, 1954 — Canada
 Collinsia perplexa (Keyserling, 1886) — USA
 Collinsia pertinens (O. P.-Cambridge, 1875) — USA
 Collinsia plumosa (Emerton, 1882) — USA, Canada
 Collinsia probata (O. P.-Cambridge, 1874) — USA
 Collinsia sachalinensis Eskov, 1990 — Russia, Japan
 Collinsia spetsbergensis (Thorell, 1871) — Holarctic
 Collinsia stylifera (Chamberlin, 1949) — USA, Canada, Alaska
 Collinsia thulensis (Jackson, 1934) — Alaska, Canada, Greenland, Spitsbergen
 Collinsia tianschanica Tanasevitch, 1989 — Kyrgyzstan

Coloncus
Coloncus Chamberlin, 1949
 Coloncus americanus (Chamberlin & Ivie, 1944) — USA
 Coloncus cascadeus Chamberlin, 1949 — USA
 Coloncus ocala Chamberlin, 1949 — USA
 Coloncus pius Chamberlin, 1949 (type species) — USA
 Coloncus siou Chamberlin, 1949 — USA, Canada

Comorella
Comorella Jocque, 1985
 Comorella spectabilis Jocque, 1985 — Comoro Islands

Concavocephalus
Concavocephalus Eskov, 1989
 Concavocephalus eskovi Marusik & Tanasevitch, 2003 — Russia
 Concavocephalus rubens Eskov, 1989 (type species) — Russia

Conglin 
Conglin Zhao & Li, 2014
 Conglin personatus Zhao & Li, 2014 - China

Connithorax
Connithorax Eskov, 1993
 Connithorax barbatus (Eskov, 1988) — Russia

Coreorgonal
Coreorgonal Bishop & Crosby, 1935
 Coreorgonal bicornis (Emerton, 1923) (type species) — USA, Canada
 Coreorgonal monoceros (Keyserling, 1884) — USA
 Coreorgonal petulcus (Millidge, 1981) — USA

Cornicephalus
Cornicephalus Saaristo & Wunderlich, 1995
 Cornicephalus jilinensis Saaristo & Wunderlich, 1995 — China

Cresmatoneta
Cresmatoneta Simon, 1929
 Cresmatoneta leucophthalma (Fage, 1946) — India
 Cresmatoneta mutinensis (Canestrini, 1868) (type species) — Palearctic
 Cresmatoneta nipponensis Saito, 1988 — Korea, Japan

Crispiphantes
Crispiphantes Tanasevitch, 1992
 Crispiphantes biseulsanensis (Paik, 1985) — China, Korea
 Crispiphantes rhomboideus (Paik, 1985) (type species) — Russia, Korea

Crosbyarachne
Crosbyarachne Charitonov, 1937
 Crosbyarachne bukovskyi Charitonov, 1937 (type species) — Turkey, Ukraine
 Crosbyarachne silvestris (Georgescu, 1973) — Italy, Austria, Romania, Slovenia, Bulgaria

Crosbylonia
Crosbylonia Eskov, 1988
 Crosbylonia borealis Eskov, 1988 — Russia

Cryptolinyphia
Cryptolinyphia Millidge, 1991
 Cryptolinyphia sola Millidge, 1991 — Colombia

Ctenophysis
Ctenophysis Millidge, 1985
 Ctenophysis chilensis Millidge, 1985 — Chile

Curtimeticus 
Curtimeticus Zhao & Li, 2014
 Curtimeticus nebulosus Zhao & Li, 2014 - China

Cyphonetria
Cyphonetria Millidge, 1995
 Cyphonetria thaia Millidge, 1995 — Thailand

Dactylopisthes
Dactylopisthes Simon, 1884
 Dactylopisthes digiticeps (Simon, 1881) (type species) — Europe to Israel, Iran, Afghanistan
 Dactylopisthes diphyus (Heimer, 1987) — Mongolia, China
 Dactylopisthes dongnai Tanasevitch, 2018 — Vietnam
 Dactylopisthes khatipara Tanasevitch, 2017 — Russia (Caucasus)
 Dactylopisthes locketi (Tanasevitch, 1983) — Central Asia
 Dactylopisthes marginalis Tanasevitch, 2018 — Thailand
 Dactylopisthes mirabilis (Tanasevitch, 1985) — Kyrgyzstan
 Dactylopisthes mirificus (Georgescu, 1976) — Romania, Russia, Ukraine
 Dactylopisthes separatus Zhao & Li, 2014 - China 
 Dactylopisthes video (Chamberlin & Ivie, 1947) — Russia, Mongolia, Alaska, Canada

Dactylopisthoides
Dactylopisthoides Eskov, 1990
 Dactylopisthoides hyperboreus Eskov, 1990 — Russia

Decipiphantes
Decipiphantes Saaristo & Tanasevitch, 1996
 Decipiphantes decipiens (L. Koch, 1879) — Finland, Russia, Mongolia

Deelemania
Deelemania Jocque & Bosmans, 1983
 Deelemania gabonensis Jocque, 1983 — Gabon
 Deelemania malawiensis Jocque & Russell-Smith, 1984 — Malawi
 Deelemania manensis Jocque & Bosmans, 1983 (type species) — Ivory Coast
 Deelemania nasuta Bosmans, 1988 — Cameroon

Dendronetria
Dendronetria Millidge & Russell-Smith, 1992
 Dendronetria humilis Millidge & Russell-Smith, 1992 — Borneo
 Dendronetria obscura Millidge & Russell-Smith, 1992 (type species) — Borneo

Denisiphantes
Denisiphantes Tu, Li & Rollard, 2005
 Denisiphantes denisi (Schenkel, 1963) — China

Diastanillus
Diastanillus Simon, 1926
 Diastanillus pecuarius (Simon, 1884) — France, Austria

Dicornua
Dicornua Oi, 1960
 Dicornua hikosanensis Oi, 1960 — Japan

Dicymbium
Dicymbium Menge, 1868
 Dicymbium elongatum (Emerton, 1882) — USA, Canada
 Dicymbium facetum (L. Koch, 1879) — Russia, Mongolia
 Dicymbium libidinosum (Kulczynski, 1926) — Russia, China
 Dicymbium nigrum (Blackwall, 1834) — Palearctic
 Dicymbium nigrum brevisetosum Locket, 1962 (type species) — Europe
 Dicymbium salaputium Saito, 1986 — Japan
 Dicymbium sinofacetum Tanasevitch, 2006 — China
 Dicymbium tibiale (Blackwall, 1836) — Palearctic
 Dicymbium yaginumai Eskov & Marusik, 1994 — Russia, Japan

Didectoprocnemis
Didectoprocnemis Denis, 1949
 Didectoprocnemis cirtensis (Simon, 1884) — Portugal, France, Algeria, Morocco, Tunisia

Diechomma
Diechomma Millidge, 1991
 Diechomma exiguum (Millidge, 1991) — Colombia
 Diechomma pretiosum Millidge, 1991 (type species) — Colombia

Diplocentria
Diplocentria Hull, 1911
 Diplocentria bidentata (Emerton, 1882) (type species) — Holarctic
 Diplocentria changajensis Wunderlich, 1995 — Mongolia
 Diplocentria forsslundi Holm, 1939 — Sweden
 Diplocentria hiberna (Barrows, 1945) — USA
 Diplocentria mediocris (Simon, 1884) — Europe
 Diplocentria perplexa (Chamberlin & Ivie, 1939) — USA, Canada
 Diplocentria rectangulata (Emerton, 1915) — Holarctic
 Diplocentria retinax (Crosby & Bishop, 1936) — USA, Canada

Diplocephaloides
Diplocephaloides Oi, 1960
 Diplocephaloides falcatus Seo, 2018 — Korea
 Diplocephaloides saganus (Bösenberg & Strand, 1906) (type species) — Korea, Japan
 Diplocephaloides uncatus Song & Li, 2010 — China

Diplocephalus
Diplocephalus Bertkau, 1883
 Diplocephalus algericus Bosmans, 1996 — Algeria
 Diplocephalus alpinus (O. P.-Cambridge, 1872) — Italy, Central Europe to Russia
 Diplocephalus altimontanus Deltshev, 1984 — Bulgaria
 Diplocephalus arnoi Isaia, 2005 — Italy
 Diplocephalus barbiger (Roewer, 1955) — Holarctic
 Diplocephalus bicurvatus Bösenberg & Strand, 1906 — Japan
 Diplocephalus bifurcatus Tanasevitch, 1989 — Turkmenistan
 Diplocephalus caecus Denis, 1952 — Belgium
 Diplocephalus caucasicus Tanasevitch, 1987 — Turkey, Russia, Georgia
 Diplocephalus connatus Bertkau, 1889 — Palearctic
 Diplocephalus connatus jacksoni O. P.-Cambridge, 1903 — England
 Diplocephalus crassilobus (Simon, 1884) — Europe, Turkey
 Diplocephalus cristatus (Blackwall, 1833) — Holarctic, New Zealand, Falkland Islands
 Diplocephalus culminicola Simon, 1884 — France
 Diplocephalus dentatus Tullgren, 1955 — Northern, Central Europe to Ukraine
 Diplocephalus graecus (O. P.-Cambridge, 1872) — Europe, North Africa, Israel
 Diplocephalus gravidus Strand, 1906 — Japan
 Diplocephalus guidoi Frick & Isaia, 2012 — Italy
 Diplocephalus helleri (L. Koch, 1869) — Europe
 Diplocephalus hispidulus Saito & Ono, 2001 — Japan
 Diplocephalus hungaricus Kulczynski, 1915 — Hungary
 Diplocephalus inanis Tanasevitch, 2014 - Morocco 
 Diplocephalus lancearius (Simon, 1884) — Algeria
 Diplocephalus latifrons (O. P.-Cambridge, 1863) — Europe, Russia
 Diplocephalus longicarpus (Simon, 1884) — France
 Diplocephalus lusiscus (Simon, 1872) — France, Belgium, Germany, Switzerland
 Diplocephalus machadoi Bosmans & Cardoso, 2010 — Portugal
 Diplocephalus marijae Bosmans, 2010 — Portugal
 Diplocephalus marusiki Eskov, 1988 — Russia
 Diplocephalus mirabilis Eskov, 1988 — Russia, China
 Diplocephalus montaneus Tanasevitch, 1992 — Central Asia
 Diplocephalus montanus Eskov, 1988 — Russia
 Diplocephalus mystacinus (Simon, 1884) — Algeria, Tunisia
 Diplocephalus parentalis Song & Li, 2010 — China
 Diplocephalus pavesii Pesarini, 1996 — Switzerland, Italy
 Diplocephalus permixtus (O. P.-Cambridge, 1871) — Palearctic
 Diplocephalus picinus (Blackwall, 1841) — Palearctic
 Diplocephalus procer (Simon, 1884) — Southern Europe
 Diplocephalus protuberans (O. P.-Cambridge, 1875) — Europe
 Diplocephalus pseudocrassilobus Gnelitsa, 2006 — Ukraine
 Diplocephalus pullinus Simon, 1918 — France
 Diplocephalus rostratus Schenkel, 1934 — Austria
 Diplocephalus sphagnicola Eskov, 1988 — Russia, Canada
 Diplocephalus subrostratus (O. P.-Cambridge, 1873) — Holarctic
 Diplocephalus tiberinus (Caporiacco, 1936) — Italy
 Diplocephalus toscanaensis Wunderlich, 2011 — Italy
 Diplocephalus transcaucasicus Tanasevitch, 1990 — Azerbaijan, Iran
 Diplocephalus turcicus Brignoli, 1972 — Greece, Turkey
 Diplocephalus uliginosus Eskov, 1988 — Russia

Diploplecta
Diploplecta Millidge, 1988
 Diploplecta adjacens Millidge, 1988 — New Zealand
 Diploplecta communis Millidge, 1988 (type species) — New Zealand
 Diploplecta duplex Millidge, 1988 — New Zealand
 Diploplecta nuda Millidge, 1988 — New Zealand
 Diploplecta opaca Millidge, 1988 — New Zealand
 Diploplecta proxima Millidge, 1988 — New Zealand
 Diploplecta simplex Millidge, 1988 — New Zealand

Diplostyla
Diplostyla Emerton, 1882
 Diplostyla concolor (Wider, 1834) — Holarctic

Diplothyron
Diplothyron Millidge, 1991
 Diplothyron fuscus Millidge, 1991 — Venezuela

Disembolus
Disembolus Chamberlin & Ivie, 1933
 Disembolus alpha (Chamberlin, 1949) — USA
 Disembolus amoenus Millidge, 1981 — USA
 Disembolus anguineus Millidge, 1981 — USA
 Disembolus bairdi Edwards, 1999 — USA
 Disembolus beta Millidge, 1981 — USA
 Disembolus concinnus Millidge, 1981 — USA
 Disembolus convolutus Millidge, 1981 — USA
 Disembolus corneliae (Chamberlin & Ivie, 1944) — USA
 Disembolus galeatus Millidge, 1981 — USA
 Disembolus hyalinus Millidge, 1981 — Canada
 Disembolus implexus Millidge, 1981 — USA
 Disembolus implicatus Millidge, 1981 — USA
 Disembolus kesimbus (Chamberlin, 1949) — USA
 Disembolus lacteus Millidge, 1981 — USA
 Disembolus lacunatus Millidge, 1981 — USA
 Disembolus phanus (Chamberlin, 1949) — USA
 Disembolus procerus Millidge, 1981 — USA
 Disembolus sacerdotalis (Crosby & Bishop, 1933) — USA, Canada
 Disembolus sinuosus Millidge, 1981 — USA
 Disembolus solanus Millidge, 1981 — USA
 Disembolus stridulans Chamberlin & Ivie, 1933 (type species) — USA
 Disembolus torquatus Millidge, 1981 — USA
 Disembolus vicinus Millidge, 1981 — USA
 Disembolus zygethus Chamberlin, 1949 — USA

Dismodicus
Dismodicus Simon, 1884
 Dismodicus alticeps Chamberlin & Ivie, 1947 — Russia, Alaska, Canada, USA
 Dismodicus bifrons (Blackwall, 1841) (type species) — Palearctic
 Dismodicus decemoculatus (Emerton, 1882) — USA, Canada, Greenland
 Dismodicus elevatus (C. L. Koch, 1838) — Palearctic
 Dismodicus fungiceps Denis, 1944 — France
 Dismodicus modicus Chamberlin & Ivie, 1947 — Alaska

Doenitzius
Doenitzius Oi, 1960
 Doenitzius minutus Seo, 2018 — Korea
 Doenitzius peniculus Oi, 1960 (type species) — Korea, Japan
 Doenitzius pruvus Oi, 1960 — Russia, China, Korea, Japan

Dolabritor
Dolabritor Millidge, 1991
 Dolabritor ascifer Millidge, 1991 — Colombia
 Dolabritor spineus Millidge, 1991 (type species) — Colombia

Donacochara
Donacochara Simon, 1884
 Donacochara deminuta Locket, 1968 — Angola
 Donacochara speciosa (Thorell, 1875) (type species) — Europe to Central Asia

Drapetisca
Drapetisca Menge, 1866
 Drapetisca alteranda Chamberlin, 1909 — USA
 Drapetisca australis Forster, 1955 — Antipodes Islands
 Drapetisca bicruris Tu & Li, 2006 — China
 Drapetisca oteroana Gertsch, 1951 — USA
 Drapetisca socialis (Sundevall, 1833) (type species) — Palearctic

Drepanotylus
Drepanotylus Holm, 1945
 Drepanotylus aduncus Sha & Zhu, 1995 — China
 Drepanotylus borealis Holm, 1945 — Sweden, Finland, Russia, Kazakhstan
 Drepanotylus holmi (Eskov, 1981) — Russia, Mongolia
 Drepanotylus pirinicus Deltshev, 1992 — Bulgaria
 Drepanotylus uncatus (O. P.-Cambridge, 1873) (type species) — Palearctic

Dresconella
Dresconella Denis, 1950
 Dresconella nivicola (Simon, 1884) — France

Dubiaranea
Dubiaranea Mello-Leitao, 1943
 Dubiaranea abjecta Millidge, 1991 — Ecuador, Peru
 Dubiaranea abundans Millidge, 1991 — Peru
 Dubiaranea affinis Millidge, 1991 — Ecuador
 Dubiaranea albodorsata Millidge, 1991 — Colombia
 Dubiaranea albolineata Millidge, 1991 — Peru
 Dubiaranea amoena Millidge, 1991 — Peru
 Dubiaranea argentata Millidge, 1991 — Bolivia
 Dubiaranea argenteovittata Mello-Leitao, 1943 (type species) — Brazil
 Dubiaranea atra Millidge, 1991 — Bolivia
 Dubiaranea atriceps Millidge, 1991 — Peru
 Dubiaranea atripalpis Millidge, 1991 — Venezuela
 Dubiaranea atrolineata Millidge, 1991 — Colombia
 Dubiaranea aureola Millidge, 1991 — Peru
 Dubiaranea bacata Millidge, 1991 — Peru
 Dubiaranea brevis Millidge, 1991 — Bolivia
 Dubiaranea caeca Millidge, 1991 — Venezuela
 Dubiaranea caledonica (Millidge, 1985) — Chile
 Dubiaranea castanea Millidge, 1991 — Peru
 Dubiaranea cekalovici (Millidge, 1985) — Chile
 Dubiaranea cerea (Millidge, 1985) — Chile
 Dubiaranea colombiana Millidge, 1991 — Colombia
 Dubiaranea concors Millidge, 1991 — Colombia
 Dubiaranea congruens Millidge, 1991 — Ecuador
 Dubiaranea crebra Millidge, 1991 — Colombia, Venezuela, Ecuador, Peru
 Dubiaranea decora Millidge, 1991 — Peru
 Dubiaranea decurtata Millidge, 1991 — Bolivia
 Dubiaranea deelemanae Millidge, 1995 — Borneo
 Dubiaranea difficilis (Mello-Leitao, 1944) — Argentina
 Dubiaranea discolor Millidge, 1991 — Colombia
 Dubiaranea distincta (Nicolet, 1849) — Chile
 Dubiaranea distracta Millidge, 1991 — Colombia
 Dubiaranea elegans Millidge, 1991 — Peru
 Dubiaranea fagicola Millidge, 1991 — Chile
 Dubiaranea falcata (Millidge, 1985) — Chile
 Dubiaranea festiva (Millidge, 1985) — Chile
 Dubiaranea fruticola Millidge, 1991 — Peru
 Dubiaranea fulgens (Millidge, 1985) — Chile
 Dubiaranea fulvolineata Millidge, 1991 — Peru
 Dubiaranea furva Millidge, 1991 — Peru
 Dubiaranea fusca Millidge, 1991 — Peru
 Dubiaranea gilva Millidge, 1991 — Colombia
 Dubiaranea gloriosa Millidge, 1991 — Colombia
 Dubiaranea grandicula Millidge, 1991 — Peru
 Dubiaranea gregalis Millidge, 1991 — Peru
 Dubiaranea habilis Millidge, 1991 — Ecuador
 Dubiaranea inquilina (Millidge, 1985) — Brazil
 Dubiaranea insignita Millidge, 1991 — Peru, Bolivia
 Dubiaranea insulana Millidge, 1991 — Juan Fernandez Islands
 Dubiaranea insulsa Millidge, 1991 — Ecuador
 Dubiaranea lepida Millidge, 1991 — Peru
 Dubiaranea levii Millidge, 1991 — Brazil
 Dubiaranea longa Millidge, 1991 — Peru
 Dubiaranea longiscapa (Millidge, 1985) — Chile
 Dubiaranea luctuosa Millidge, 1991 — Peru
 Dubiaranea lugubris Millidge, 1991 — Ecuador
 Dubiaranea maculata (Millidge, 1985) — Chile
 Dubiaranea manufera (Millidge, 1985) — Chile
 Dubiaranea margaritata Millidge, 1991 — Colombia, Venezuela
 Dubiaranea media Millidge, 1991 — Venezuela
 Dubiaranea mediocris Millidge, 1991 — Peru
 Dubiaranea melanocephala Millidge, 1991 — Peru
 Dubiaranea melica Millidge, 1991 — Peru
 Dubiaranea mirabilis Millidge, 1991 — Ecuador
 Dubiaranea modica Millidge, 1991 — Ecuador
 Dubiaranea morata Millidge, 1991 — Ecuador
 Dubiaranea nivea Millidge, 1991 — Bolivia
 Dubiaranea opaca Millidge, 1991 — Peru
 Dubiaranea orba Millidge, 1991 — Ecuador
 Dubiaranea ornata Millidge, 1991 — Colombia
 Dubiaranea penai (Millidge, 1985) — Chile
 Dubiaranea persimilis Millidge, 1991 — Ecuador
 Dubiaranea procera Millidge, 1991 — Peru
 Dubiaranea propinquua (Millidge, 1985) — Chile
 Dubiaranea propria Millidge, 1991 — Colombia
 Dubiaranea proxima Millidge, 1991 — Ecuador
 Dubiaranea pulchra Millidge, 1991 — Venezuela
 Dubiaranea pullata Millidge, 1991 — Peru
 Dubiaranea remota Millidge, 1991 — Argentina
 Dubiaranea rufula Millidge, 1991 — Peru
 Dubiaranea saucia Millidge, 1991 — Brazil
 Dubiaranea setigera Millidge, 1991 — Colombia
 Dubiaranea signifera Millidge, 1991 — Bolivia
 Dubiaranea silvae Millidge, 1991 — Peru
 Dubiaranea silvicola Millidge, 1991 — Colombia
 Dubiaranea similis Millidge, 1991 — Chile
 Dubiaranea solita Millidge, 1991 — Colombia
 Dubiaranea speciosa Millidge, 1991 — Peru
 Dubiaranea stellata (Millidge, 1985) — Chile
 Dubiaranea subtilis (Keyserling, 1886) — Peru
 Dubiaranea teres Millidge, 1991 — Ecuador
 Dubiaranea tridentata Millidge, 1993 — Peru
 Dubiaranea tristis (Mello-Leitao, 1941) — Argentina
 Dubiaranea truncata Millidge, 1991 — Peru
 Dubiaranea turbidula (Keyserling, 1886) — Brazil, Peru
 Dubiaranea usitata Millidge, 1991 — Colombia
 Dubiaranea varia Millidge, 1991 — Peru
 Dubiaranea variegata Millidge, 1991 — Colombia
 Dubiaranea versicolor Millidge, 1991 — Colombia, Ecuador, Peru
 Dubiaranea veterana Millidge, 1991 — Ecuador
 Dubiaranea vetusta Millidge, 1991 — Ecuador

Dumoga
Dumoga Millidge & Russell-Smith, 1992
 Dumoga arboricola Millidge & Russell-Smith, 1992 (type species) — Sulawesi
 Dumoga buratino Tanasevitch, 2017 - Indonesia (Sumatra)
 Dumoga complexipalpis Millidge & Russell-Smith, 1992 — Sulawesi

Dunedinia
Dunedinia Millidge, 1988
 Dunedinia decolor Millidge, 1988 — New Zealand
 Dunedinia denticulata Millidge, 1988 (type species) — New Zealand
 Dunedinia occidentalis Millidge, 1993 — Western Australia
 Dunedinia opaca Millidge, 1993 — South Australia
 Dunedinia pullata Millidge, 1988 — New Zealand

Eborilaira
Eborilaira Eskov, 1989
 Eborilaira alpina Eskov, 1989 — Russia

Eldonnia
Eldonnia Tanasevitch, 2008
 Eldonnia kayaensis (Paik, 1965) — Russia, Korea, Japan

Emenista
Emenista Simon, 1894
 Emenista bisinuosa Simon, 1894 — India

Enguterothrix
Enguterothrix Denis, 1962
 Enguterothrix crinipes Denis, 1962 (type species) — Congo
 Enguterothrix simpulum (Tanasevitch, 2014) - Thailand

Entelecara
Entelecara Simon, 1884
 Entelecara acuminata (Wider, 1834) (type species) — Holarctic
 Entelecara aestiva Simon, 1918 — France, Italy
 Entelecara aurea Gao & Zhu, 1993 — China
 Entelecara cacuminum Denis, 1954 — France
 Entelecara congenera (O. P.-Cambridge, 1879) — Palearctic
 Entelecara dabudongensis Paik, 1983 — Russia, China, Korea, Japan
 Entelecara errata O. P.-Cambridge, 1913 — Europe, Russia
 Entelecara erythropus (Westring, 1851) — Palearctic
 Entelecara flavipes (Blackwall, 1834) — Europe, Russia
 Entelecara forsslundi Tullgren, 1955 — Sweden, Russia, Estonia, Ukraine
 Entelecara helfridae Tullgren, 1955 — Sweden
 Entelecara italica Thaler, 1984 — Italy
 Entelecara klefbecki Tullgren, 1955 — Sweden
 Entelecara media Kulczynski, 1887 — Holarctic
 Entelecara obscura Miller, 1971 — Czech Republic, Slovakia
 Entelecara omissa O. P.-Cambridge, 1902 — Europe
 Entelecara schmitzi Kulczynski, 1905 — Madeira, France
 Entelecara sombra (Chamberlin & Ivie, 1947) — Alaska, Canada, USA
 Entelecara tanikawai Tazoe, 1993 — Japan
 Entelecara truncatifrons (O. P.-Cambridge, 1875) — France, Corsica, Algeria
 Entelecara turbinata Simon, 1918 — France

Eordea
Eordea Simon, 1899
 Eordea bicolor Simon, 1899 — Sumatra

Epibellowia
Epibellowia Tanasevitch, 1996
 Epibellowia enormita (Tanasevitch, 1988) — Russia
 Epibellowia pacifica (Eskov & Marusik, 1992) — Russia
 Epibellowia septentrionalis (Oi, 1960) (type species) — Russia, Japan

Epiceraticelus
Epiceraticelus Crosby & Bishop, 1931
 Epiceraticelus fluvialis Crosby & Bishop, 1931 — USA
 Epiceraticelus mandyae Draney, Milne, Ulyshen & Madriz, 2019 — USA

Epigyphantes
Epigyphantes Saaristo & Tanasevitch, 2004
 Epigyphantes epigynatus (Tanasevitch, 1988) — Russia

Epigytholus
Epigytholus Tanasevitch, 1996
 Epigytholus kaszabi (Wunderlich, 1995) — Russia, Mongolia

Episolder
Episolder Tanasevitch, 1996
 Episolder finitimus Tanasevitch, 1996 — Russia

Epiwubana
Epiwubana Millidge, 1991
 Epiwubana jucunda Millidge, 1991 — Chile

Eridantes
Eridantes Crosby & Bishop, 1933
 Eridantes diodontos Prentice & Redak, 2013 — USA, Mexico
 Eridantes erigonoides (Emerton, 1882) (type species) — USA
 Eridantes utibilis Crosby & Bishop, 1933 — USA, Canada

Erigomicronus
Erigomicronus Tanasevitch, 2018
 Erigomicronus lautus (Saito, 1984) — Japan
 Erigomicronus longembolus (Wunderlich & Li, 1995) (type species) — Russia (Far East), China

Erigone
Erigone Audouin, 1826
 Erigone albescens Banks, 1898 — USA
 Erigone aletris Crosby & Bishop, 1928 — USA, Canada, Scotland, Italy
 Erigone allani Chamberlin & Ivie, 1947 — Alaska
 Erigone alsaida Crosby & Bishop, 1928 — USA
 Erigone angela Chamberlin & Ivie, 1939 — USA
 Erigone antarctica Simon, 1884 — Chile
 Erigone antegona Chickering, 1970 — Panama
 Erigone apophysalis Tanasevitch, 2017 — Indonesia (Sumatra)
 Erigone aptuna Chickering, 1970 — Panama
 Erigone arctica (White, 1852) — Holarctic
 Erigone arctica maritima Kulczynski, 1902 — Northern Europe, Russia
 Erigone arctica palaearctica Braendegaard, 1934 — Scandinavia, Russia
 Erigone arctica sibirica Kulczynski, 1908 — Russia
 Erigone arctica soerenseni Holm, 1956 — Greenland
 Erigone arcticola Chamberlin & Ivie, 1947 — Russia, Kazakhstan, Alaska
 Erigone arctophylacis Crosby & Bishop, 1928 — USA, Canada
 Erigone aspura Chamberlin & Ivie, 1939 — Alaska
 Erigone atra Blackwall, 1833 — Holarctic
 Erigone autumnalis Emerton, 1882 — USA to Panama, West Indies, Azores, Europe, UAE
 Erigone barrowsi Crosby & Bishop, 1928 — USA
 Erigone benes Chamberlin & Ivie, 1939 — USA
 Erigone bereta Chickering, 1970 — Panama
 Erigone bifurca Locket, 1982 — Malaysia, Philippines, Krakatau
 Erigone blaesa Crosby & Bishop, 1928 — USA, Canada
 Erigone brevipes Tu & Li, 2004 — Vietnam
 Erigone canthognatha Chamberlin & Ivie, 1935 — USA
 Erigone clavipalpis Millidge, 1991 — Peru
 Erigone coloradensis Keyserling, 1886 — USA, Canada, Alaska
 Erigone convalescens Jocque, 1985 — Comoro Islands
 Erigone cristatopalpus Simon, 1884 — Holarctic
 Erigone crosbyi Schenkel, 1950 — USA
 Erigone dentichelis Miller, 1970 — Angola
 Erigone denticulata Chamberlin & Ivie, 1939 — USA
 Erigone dentigera O. P.-Cambridge, 1874 — Holarctic
 Erigone dentipalpis (Wider, 1834) — Holarctic
 Erigone dentipalpis syriaca O. P.-Cambridge, 1872 — Syria
 Erigone dentosa O. P.-Cambridge, 1894 — USA to Guatemala, Antigua (Belgium, introduced)
 Erigone digena Chickering, 1970 — Panama, Jamaica, Puerto Rico
 Erigone dipona Chickering, 1970 — Panama
 Erigone dumitrescuae Georgescu, 1969 — Romania
 Erigone edentata Saito & Ono, 2001 — Japan
 Erigone eisenschmidti Wunderlich, 1976 — Queensland
 Erigone ephala Crosby & Bishop, 1928 — USA, Canada
 Erigone fellita Keyserling, 1886 — Peru
 Erigone fluctuans O. P.-Cambridge, 1875 — France
 Erigone fluminea Millidge, 1991 — Venezuela
 Erigone grandidens Tu & Li, 2004 — Vietnam
 Erigone himeshimensis Strand, 1918 — Japan
 Erigone hydrophytae Ivie & Barrows, 1935 — USA
 Erigone hypenema Crosby & Bishop, 1928 — USA
 Erigone hypoarctica Eskov, 1989 — Russia
 Erigone infernalis Keyserling, 1886 — USA
 Erigone irrita Jocque, 1984 — South Africa
 Erigone jaegeri Baehr, 1984 — Central Europe, China
 Erigone jugorum Simon, 1884 — France
 Erigone koratensis Strand, 1918 — Japan
 Erigone koshiensis Oi, 1960 — China, Korea, Taiwan, Japan
 Erigone lata Song & Li, 2008 — China
 Erigone longipalpis (Sundevall, 1830) (type species) — Palearctic
 Erigone longipalpis meridionalis Simon, 1926 — England, France
 Erigone longipalpis pirini Deltshev, 1983 — Bulgaria
 Erigone malvari Barrion & Litsinger, 1995 — Philippines
 Erigone matanuskae Chamberlin & Ivie, 1947 — Alaska
 Erigone miniata Baert, 1990 — Galapagos Islands
 Erigone monterreyensis Gertsch & Davis, 1937 — Mexico
 Erigone neocaledonica Kritscher, 1966 — New Caledonia
 Erigone nepalensis Wunderlich, 1983 — Nepal
 Erigone nigrimana Thorell, 1875 — Italy
 Erigone nitidithorax Miller, 1970 — Angola
 Erigone ostiaria Crosby & Bishop, 1928 — USA
 Erigone palustris Millidge, 1991 — Peru
 Erigone paradisicola Crosby & Bishop, 1928 — USA
 Erigone pauperula (Bösenberg & Strand, 1906) — Japan
 Erigone personata Gertsch & Davis, 1936 — USA
 Erigone poeyi Simon, 1897 — St. Vincent
 Erigone praecursa Chamberlin & Ivie, 1939 — USA
 Erigone prominens Bösenberg & Strand, 1906 — Cameroon to Japan, New Zealand
 Erigone promiscua (O. P.-Cambridge, 1873) — Europe, Russia
 Erigone pseudovagans Caporiacco, 1935 — Karakorum
 Erigone psychrophila Thorell, 1871 — Holarctic
 Erigone reducta Schenkel, 1950 — USA
 Erigone remota L. Koch, 1869 — Palearctic
 Erigone remota dentigera Simon, 1926 — Switzerland
 Erigone rohtangensis Tikader, 1981 — India
 Erigone rutila Millidge, 1995 — Thailand
 Erigone sagibia Strand, 1918 — Japan
 Erigone sagicola Dönitz & Strand, 1906 — Japan
 Erigone sinensis Schenkel, 1936 — Russia, Kyrgyzstan, Mongolia, China
 Erigone sirimonensis Bosmans, 1977 — Kenya
 Erigone spadix Thorell, 1875 — Italy
 Erigone stygia Gertsch, 1973 — Hawaii
 Erigone svenssoni Holm, 1975 — Scandinavia, Russia
 Erigone tamazunchalensis Gertsch & Davis, 1937 — Mexico
 Erigone tanana Chamberlin & Ivie, 1947 — Alaska
 Erigone tenuimana Simon, 1884 — Europe
 Erigone tepena Chickering, 1970 — Jamaica
 Erigone tirolensis L. Koch, 1872 — Holarctic
 Erigone tolucana Gertsch & Davis, 1937 — Mexico
 Erigone tristis (Banks, 1892) — USA
 Erigone uintana Chamberlin & Ivie, 1935 — USA
 Erigone uliginosa Millidge, 1991 — Peru
 Erigone watertoni Simon, 1897 — St. Vincent
 Erigone welchi Jackson, 1911 — Ireland to Estonia, Moldavia
 Erigone whitneyana Chamberlin & Ivie, 1935 — USA
 Erigone whymperi O. P.-Cambridge, 1877 — Canada, Greenland, Russia, Mongilia
 Erigone whymperi minor Jackson, 1933 — Canada
 Erigone wiltoni Locket, 1973 — New Zealand, Comoro Islands
 Erigone zabluta Keyserling, 1886 — Peru
 Erigone zheduoshanensis Song & Li, 2008 — China

Erigonella
Erigonella Dahl, 1901
 Erigonella groenlandica Strand, 1905 — Canada
 Erigonella hiemalis (Blackwall, 1841) (type species) — Palearctic
 Erigonella ignobilis (O. P.-Cambridge, 1871) — Palearctic
 Erigonella stubbei Heimer, 1987 — Mongolia
 Erigonella subelevata (L. Koch, 1869) — Europe
 Erigonella subelevata pyrenaea Denis, 1964 — France

Erigonoploides
Erigonoploides Eskov, 1989
 Erigonoploides cardiratus Eskov, 1989 — Russia

Erigonoplus
Erigonoplus Simon, 1884
 Erigonoplus castellanus (O. P.-Cambridge, 1875) — Portugal, Spain
 Erigonoplus depressifrons (Simon, 1884) — Portugal, Spain, France
 Erigonoplus dilatus (Denis, 1949) — Andorra
 Erigonoplus foveatus (Dahl, 1912) - Central Europe to Ukraine, Russia
 Erigonoplus globipes (L. Koch, 1872) — Palearctic
 Erigonoplus inclarus (Simon, 1881) (type species) — Corsica
 Erigonoplus inspinosus Wunderlich, 1995 — Greece
 Erigonoplus jarmilae (Miller, 1943) — Austria, Czech Republic, Slovakia, Russia
 Erigonoplus justus (O. P.-Cambridge, 1875) — Belgium, France, Germany
 Erigonoplus kirghizicus Tanasevitch, 1989 — Kazakhstan
 Erigonoplus latefissus (Denis, 1968) — Morocco
 Erigonoplus minaretifer Eskov, 1986 — Russia
 Erigonoplus nasutus (O. P.-Cambridge, 1879) — Portugal, France
 Erigonoplus nigrocaeruleus (Simon, 1881) — Corsica, Iran
 Erigonoplus ninae Tanasevitch & Fet, 1986 — Turkmenistan, Iran
 Erigonoplus nobilis Thaler, 1991 — Italy
 Erigonoplus sengleti Tanasevitch, 2008 — Iran
 Erigonoplus setosus Wunderlich, 1995 — Croatia, Greece
 Erigonoplus sibiricus Eskov & Marusik, 1997 — Russia
 Erigonoplus simplex Millidge, 1979 — Italy
 Erigonoplus spinifemuralis Dimitrov, 2003 — Greece, Bulgaria, Turkey, Ukraine
 Erigonoplus turriger (Simon, 1881) — France
 Erigonoplus zagros Tanasevitch, 2009 — Iran

Erigonops
Erigonops Scharff, 1990
 Erigonops littoralis (Hewitt, 1915) — South Africa

Erigophantes
Erigophantes Wunderlich, 1995
 Erigophantes borneoensis Wunderlich, 1995 — Borneo

Eskovia
Eskovia Marusik & Saaristo, 1999
 Eskovia exarmata (Eskov, 1989) (type species) — Russia, Canada
 Eskovia mongolica Marusik & Saaristo, 1999 — Mongolia

Eskovina
Eskovina Kocak & Kemal, 2006
 Eskovina clava (Zhu & Wen, 1980) — Russia, China, Korea

Esophyllas
Esophyllas Prentice & Redak, 2012
 Esophyllas synankylis Prentice & Redak, 2012 — USA
 Esophyllas vetteri Prentice & Redak, 2012 (type species) — USA

Estrandia
Estrandia Blauvelt, 1936
 Estrandia grandaeva (Keyserling, 1886) — Holarctic

Eulaira
Eulaira Chamberlin & Ivie, 1933
 Eulaira altura Chamberlin & Ivie, 1945 — USA
 Eulaira arctoa Holm, 1960 — Alaska
 Eulaira chelata Chamberlin & Ivie, 1939 — USA
 Eulaira dela Chamberlin & Ivie, 1933 (type species) — USA
 Eulaira delana Chamberlin & Ivie, 1939 — USA
 Eulaira hidalgoana Gertsch & Davis, 1937 — Mexico
 Eulaira kaiba Chamberlin, 1949 — USA
 Eulaira mana Chamberlin & Ivie, 1935 — USA
 Eulaira obscura Chamberlin & Ivie, 1945 — USA
 Eulaira schediana Chamberlin & Ivie, 1933 — USA
 Eulaira schediana nigrescens Chamberlin & Ivie, 1945 — USA
 Eulaira simplex (Chamberlin, 1919) — USA
 Eulaira suspecta Gertsch & Mulaik, 1936 — USA
 Eulaira thumbia Chamberlin & Ivie, 1945 — USA
 Eulaira wioma Chamberlin, 1949 — USA

Eurymorion
Eurymorion Millidge, 1993
 Eurymorion insigne (Millidge, 1991) (type species) — Brazil
 Eurymorion mourai Rodrigues & Ott, 2010 — Brazil
 Eurymorion murici Rodrigues & Ott, 2010 — Brazil
 Eurymorion nobile (Millidge, 1991) — Brazil
 Eurymorion triunfo Rodrigues & Ott, 2010 — Bolivia, Brazil

Evansia
Evansia O. P.-Cambridge, 1900
 Evansia merens O. P.-Cambridge, 1901 — Palearctic

Exechopsis
Exechopsis Millidge, 1991
 Exechopsis conspicua Millidge, 1991 — Peru, Brazil
 Exechopsis eberhardi Rodrigues, Lemos & Brescovit, 2013 — Brazil
 Exechopsis versicolor Millidge, 1991 (type species) — Colombia, Ecuador

Exocora
Exocora Millidge, 1991
 Exocora girotii Lemos & Brescovit, 2013 — Brazil
 Exocora medonho Lemos & Brescovit, 2013 — Brazil
 Exocora nogueirai Lemos & Brescovit, 2013 — Brazil
 Exocora pallida Millidge, 1991 — Venezuela
 Exocora phoenix Lemos & Brescovit, 2013 — Brazil
 Exocora proba Millidge, 1991 (type species) — Bolivia
 Exocora ribeiroi Lemos & Brescovit, 2013 — Brazil
 Exocora una Lemos & Brescovit, 2013 — Brazil

Fageiella
Fageiella Kratochvil, 1934
 Fageiella ensigera Deeleman-Reinhold, 1974 — Serbia
 Fageiella patellata (Kulczynski, 1913) (type species) — Southeastern Europe

Falklandoglenes
Falklandoglenes Usher, 1983
 Falklandoglenes spinosa Usher, 1983 — Falkland Islands

Fissiscapus
Fissiscapus Millidge, 1991
 Fissiscapus attercop Miller, 2007 — Ecuador
 Fissiscapus fractus Millidge, 1991 — Colombia
 Fissiscapus pusillus Millidge, 1991 (type species) — Colombia

Fistulaphantes
Fistulaphantes Tanasevitch & Saaristo, 2006
 Fistulaphantes canalis Tanasevitch & Saaristo, 2006 — Nepal

Flagelliphantes
Flagelliphantes Saaristo & Tanasevitch, 1996
 Flagelliphantes bergstromi (Schenkel, 1931) — Palearctic
 Flagelliphantes flagellifer (Tanasevitch, 1988) (type species) — Russia
 Flagelliphantes sterneri (Eskov & Marusik, 1994) — Russia

Floricomus
Floricomus Crosby & Bishop, 1925
 Floricomus bishopi Ivie & Barrows, 1935 — USA
 Floricomus crosbyi Ivie & Barrows, 1935 — USA
 Floricomus littoralis Chamberlin & Ivie, 1935 — USA
 Floricomus mulaiki Gertsch & Davis, 1936 — USA
 Floricomus nasutus (Emerton, 1911) — USA
 Floricomus nigriceps (Banks, 1906) — USA
 Floricomus ornatulus Gertsch & Ivie, 1936 — USA
 Floricomus plumalis (Crosby, 1905) — USA
 Floricomus praedesignatus Bishop & Crosby, 1935 — USA, Canada
 Floricomus pythonicus Crosby & Bishop, 1925 — USA
 Floricomus rostratus (Emerton, 1882) (type species) — USA
 Floricomus setosus Chamberlin & Ivie, 1944 — USA
 Floricomus tallulae Chamberlin & Ivie, 1944 — USA

Florinda
Florinda O. P.-Cambridge, 1896
 Florinda coccinea (Hentz, 1850) — USA, Mexico, West Indies

Floronia
Floronia Simon, 1887
 Floronia annulipes Berland, 1913 — Ecuador
 Floronia bucculenta (Clerck, 1757) (type species) — Europe, Russia
 Floronia exornata (L. Koch, 1878) — Korea, Japan
 Floronia hunanensis Li & Song, 1993 — China
 Floronia jiuhuensis Li & Zhu, 1987 — China
 Floronia zhejiangensis Zhu, Chen & Sha, 1987 — China

Formiphantes
Formiphantes Saaristo & Tanasevitch, 1996
 Formiphantes lephthyphantiformis (Strand, 1907) — Europe

Frederickus
Frederickus Paquin et al., 2008
 Frederickus coylei Paquin et al., 2008 (type species) — USA, Canada
 Frederickus wilburi (Levi & Levi, 1955) — USA, Canada

Frontella
Frontella Kulczynski, 1908
 Frontella pallida Kulczynski, 1908 — Russia

Frontinella
Frontinella F. O. P.-Cambridge, 1902
 Frontinella bella Bryant, 1948 — Hispaniola
 Frontinella communis (Hentz, 1850) — North, Central America
 Frontinella huachuca Gertsch & Davis, 1946 — USA
 Frontinella huachuca benevola Gertsch & Davis, 1946 — Mexico
 Frontinella hubeiensis Li & Song, 1993 — China
 Frontinella laeta (O. P.-Cambridge, 1898) (type species) — Mexico
 Frontinella omega Kraus, 1955 — El Salvador
 Frontinella potosia Gertsch & Davis, 1946 — Mexico
 Frontinella pyramitela (Walckenaer, 1841) — North, Central America
 Frontinella tibialis F. O. P.-Cambridge, 1902 — Mexico
 Frontinella zhui Li & Song, 1993 — China

Frontinellina
Frontinellina van Helsdingen, 1969
 Frontinellina dearmata (Kulczynski, 1899) — Madeira
 Frontinellina frutetorum (C. L. Koch, 1834) (type species) — Palearctic
 Frontinellina locketi van Helsdingen, 1970 — South Africa

Frontiphantes
Frontiphantes Wunderlich, 1987
 Frontiphantes fulgurenotatus (Schenkel, 1938) — Madeira

Fusciphantes
Fusciphantes Oi, 1960
 Fusciphantes enmusubi (Ihara, Nakano & Tomikawa, 2017) — Japan
 Fusciphantes hibanus (Saito, 1992) — Japan
 Fusciphantes iharai (Saito, 1992) — Japan
 Fusciphantes longiscapus Oi, 1960 (type species) — Japan
 Fusciphantes nojimai (Ihara, 1995) — Japan
 Fusciphantes occidentalis (Ihara, Nakano & Tomikawa, 2017) — Japan
 Fusciphantes okiensis (Ihara, 1995) — Japan
 Fusciphantes saitoi (Ihara, 1995) — Japan
 Fusciphantes setouchi (Ihara, 1995) — Japan
 Fusciphantes tsurusakii (Ihara, 1995) — Japan

Gibbafroneta
Gibbafroneta Merrett, 2004
 Gibbafroneta gibbosa Merrett, 2004 — Congo

Gibothorax
Gibothorax Eskov, 1989
 Gibothorax tchernovi Eskov, 1989 — Russia

Gigapassus
Gigapassus Miller, 2007
 Gigapassus octarine Miller, 2007 — Argentina

Gladiata 
Gladiata Zhao & Li, 2014
 Gladiata fengli Zhao & Li, 2014 -  China

Glebala 
Glebala Zhao & Li, 2014
 Glebala aspera Zhao & Li, 2014 -  China

Glomerosus 
Glomerosus Zhao & Li, 2014
 Glomerosus lateralis Zhao & Li, 2014 - China

Glyphesis
Glyphesis Simon, 1926
 Glyphesis asiaticus Eskov, 1989 — Russia
 Glyphesis cottonae (La Touche, 1946) — Palearctic
 Glyphesis idahoanus (Chamberlin, 1949) — USA
 Glyphesis nemoralis Esyunin & Efimik, 1994 — Russia, Ukraine
 Glyphesis scopulifer (Emerton, 1882) — USA, Canada
 Glyphesis servulus (Simon, 1881) (type species) — Europe
 Glyphesis taoplesius Wunderlich, 1969 — Denmark, Germany, Hungary, Poland, Slovakia, Russia

Gnathonargus
Gnathonargus Bishop & Crosby, 1935
 Gnathonargus unicorn (Banks, 1892) — USA

Gnathonarium
Gnathonarium Karsch, 1881
 Gnathonarium biconcavum Tu & Li, 2004 — China
 Gnathonarium dentatum (Wider, 1834) (type species) — Palearctic
 Gnathonarium dentatum orientale (O. P.-Cambridge, 1872) — Israel
 Gnathonarium exsiccatum (Bösenberg & Strand, 1906) — Japan
 Gnathonarium gibberum Oi, 1960 — Russia, China, Korea, Japan
 Gnathonarium luzon Tanasevitch, 2017 - Philippines 
 Gnathonarium suppositum (Kulczynski, 1885) — Russia, Alaska, Canada
 Gnathonarium taczanowskii (O. P.-Cambridge, 1873) — Russia, Mongolia, China, Alaska, Canada

Gnathonaroides
Gnathonaroides Bishop & Crosby, 1938
 Gnathonaroides pedalis (Emerton, 1923) — USA, Canada

Gonatium
Gonatium Menge, 1868
 Gonatium arimaense Oi, 1960 — Korea, Japan
 Gonatium biimpressum Simon, 1884 — Corsica to Italy
 Gonatium cappadocium Millidge, 1981 — Turkey
 Gonatium crassipalpum Bryant, 1933 — USA, Canada, Alaska
 Gonatium dayense Simon, 1884 — Algeria
 Gonatium ensipotens (Simon, 1881) — Southwestern Europe
 Gonatium geniculosum Simon, 1918 — France
 Gonatium hilare (Thorell, 1875) — Palearctic
 Gonatium japonicum Simon, 1906 — Russia, China, Korea, Japan
 Gonatium nemorivagum (O. P.-Cambridge, 1875) — Southern Europe
 Gonatium nipponicum Millidge, 1981 — Russia, Japan
 Gonatium occidentale Simon, 1918 — France, Spain, Algeria, Morocco. Israel
 Gonatium orientale Fage, 1931 — Romania, Bulgaria
 Gonatium pacificum Eskov, 1989 — Russia
 Gonatium paradoxum (L. Koch, 1869) — Palearctic
 Gonatium petrunkewitschi Caporiacco, 1949 — Kenya
 Gonatium rubellum (Blackwall, 1841) — Palearctic
 Gonatium rubens (Blackwall, 1833) (type species) — Palearctic
 Gonatium strugaense Drensky, 1929 — Macedonia

Gonatoraphis
Gonatoraphis Millidge, 1991
 Gonatoraphis aenea Millidge, 1991 — Colombia
 Gonatoraphis lobata Millidge, 1991 (type species) — Colombia
 Gonatoraphis lysistrata Miller, 2007 — Colombia

Goneatara
Goneatara Bishop & Crosby, 1935
 Goneatara eranistes (Crosby & Bishop, 1927) — USA
 Goneatara nasutus (Barrows, 1943) — USA
 Goneatara platyrhinus (Crosby & Bishop, 1927) (type species) — USA
 Goneatara plausibilis Bishop & Crosby, 1935 — USA

Gongylidiellum
Gongylidiellum Simon, 1884
 Gongylidiellum blandum Miller, 1970 — Angola
 Gongylidiellum bracteatum Zhao & Li, 2014 - China 
 Gongylidiellum caucasicum Tanasevitch & Ponomarev, 2015 - Russia
 Gongylidiellum confusum Thaler, 1987 — India, Pakistan
 Gongylidiellum crassipes Denis, 1952 — Romania
 Gongylidiellum edentatum Miller, 1951 — Central, southern Europe
 Gongylidiellum hipponense (Simon, 1926) — Algeria
 Gongylidiellum kathmanduense Wunderlich, 1983 — Nepal
 Gongylidiellum latebricola (O. P.-Cambridge, 1871) (type species) — Palearctic
 Gongylidiellum linguiformis Tu & Li, 2004 — Vietnam
 Gongylidiellum minutum (Banks, 1892) — USA
 Gongylidiellum murcidum Simon, 1884 — Palearctic
 Gongylidiellum nepalense Wunderlich, 1983 — India, Nepal
 Gongylidiellum nigrolimbatum Caporiacco, 1935 — Karakorum
 Gongylidiellum orduense Wunderlich, 1995 — Turkey, Georgia
 Gongylidiellum tennesseense Petrunkevitch, 1925 — USA
 Gongylidiellum uschuaiense Simon, 1902 — Argentina
 Gongylidiellum vivum (O. P.-Cambridge, 1875) — Palearctic

Gongylidioides
Gongylidioides Oi, 1960
 Gongylidioides acmodontus Tu & Li, 2006 — China
 Gongylidioides angustus Tu & Li, 2006 — Taiwan
 Gongylidioides communis Saito & Ono, 2001 — Japan
 Gongylidioides cucullatus Oi, 1960 (type species) — Japan
 Gongylidioides diellipticus Song & Li, 2008 — Taiwan
 Gongylidioides foratus (Ma & Zhu, 1990) — China
 Gongylidioides galeritus Saito & Ono, 2001 — Japan
 Gongylidioides griseolineatus (Schenkel, 1936) — Russia, China
 Gongylidioides kaihotsui Saito & Ono, 2001 — Japan
 Gongylidioides keralaensis Tanasevitch, 2011 — India
 Gongylidioides kouqianensis Tu & Li, 2006 — China
 Gongylidioides lagenoscapis Yin, 2012 — China
 Gongylidioides monocornis Saito & Ono, 2001 — Japan
 Gongylidioides onoi Tazoe, 1994 — China, Vietnam, Japan
 Gongylidioides pectinatus Tanasevitch, 2011 — India
 Gongylidioides protegulus Tanasevitch & Marusik, 2019 — Taiwan
 Gongylidioides rimatus (Ma & Zhu, 1990) — Russia, China
 Gongylidioides ussuricus Eskov, 1992 — Russia, China

Gongylidium
Gongylidium Menge, 1868
 Gongylidium baltoroi Caporiacco, 1935 — Karakorum
 Gongylidium rufipes (Linnaeus, 1758) (type species) — Palearctic
 Gongylidium soror Thaler, 1993 — Italy

Grammonota
Grammonota Emerton, 1882
 Grammonota angusta Dondale, 1959 — USA, Canada
 Grammonota barnesi Dondale, 1959 — USA
 Grammonota calcarata Bryant, 1948 — Hispaniola
 Grammonota capitata Emerton, 1924 — USA
 Grammonota chamberlini Ivie & Barrows, 1935 — USA
 Grammonota coloradensis Dondale, 1959 — USA
 Grammonota culebra Müller & Heimer, 1991 — Colombia
 Grammonota dalunda Chickering, 1970 — Panama
 Grammonota dubia (O. P.-Cambridge, 1898) — Guatemala
 Grammonota electa Bishop & Crosby, 1933 — Costa Rica
 Grammonota emertoni Bryant, 1940 — Cuba
 Grammonota gentilis Banks, 1898 — North America
 Grammonota gigas (Banks, 1896) — USA
 Grammonota innota Chickering, 1970 — Panama
 Grammonota inornata Emerton, 1882 — USA, Canada
 Grammonota insana (Banks, 1898) — Mexico
 Grammonota inusiata Bishop & Crosby, 1933 — USA
 Grammonota jamaicensis Dondale, 1959 — Jamaica
 Grammonota kincaidi (Banks, 1906) — USA
 Grammonota lutacola Chickering, 1970 — Panama
 Grammonota maculata Banks, 1896 — USA, Costa Rica
 Grammonota maritima Emerton, 1925 — Canada
 Grammonota nigriceps Banks, 1898 — Mexico
 Grammonota nigrifrons Gertsch & Mulaik, 1936 — USA
 Grammonota ornata (O. P.-Cambridge, 1875) — USA, Canada
 Grammonota pallipes Banks, 1895 — USA
 Grammonota pergrata (O. P.-Cambridge, 1894) — Guatemala
 Grammonota pictilis (O. P.-Cambridge, 1875) (type species) — USA, Canada
 Grammonota salicicola Chamberlin, 1949 — USA
 Grammonota samariensis Müller & Heimer, 1991 — Colombia
 Grammonota secata Chickering, 1970 — Panama, Colombia
 Grammonota semipallida Emerton, 1919 — Canada
 Grammonota subarctica Dondale, 1959 — Alaska
 Grammonota suspiciosa Gertsch & Mulaik, 1936 — USA
 Grammonota tabuna Chickering, 1970 — Costa Rica, Panama
 Grammonota teresta Chickering, 1970 — Mexico, Panama, Colombia
 Grammonota texana (Banks, 1899) — USA
 Grammonota trivittata Banks, 1895 — USA
 Grammonota trivittata georgiana Chamberlin & Ivie, 1944 — USA
 Grammonota vittata Barrows, 1919 — USA
 Grammonota zephyra Dondale, 1959 — USA

Graphomoa
Graphomoa Chamberlin, 1924
 Graphomoa theridioides Chamberlin, 1924 — USA

Gravipalpus
Gravipalpus Millidge, 1991
 Gravipalpus callosus Millidge, 1991 (type species) — Brazil
 Gravipalpus crassus Millidge, 1991 — Peru
 Gravipalpus standifer Miller, 2007 — Argentina

Habreuresis
Habreuresis Millidge, 1991
 Habreuresis falcata Millidge, 1991 (type species) — Chile
 Habreuresis recta Millidge, 1991 — Chile

Halorates
Halorates Hull, 1911
 Halorates altaicus Tanasevitch, 2013 — Kazakhstan
 Halorates concavus Tanasevitch, 2011 — Pakistan
 Halorates reprobus (O. P.-Cambridge, 1879) (type species) — Europe, Russia
 Halorates sexastriatus Fei, Gao & Chen, 1997 — China

Haplinis
Haplinis Simon, 1894
 Haplinis abbreviata (Blest, 1979) — New Zealand
 Haplinis alticola Blest & Vink, 2002 — New Zealand
 Haplinis anomala Blest & Vink, 2003 — New Zealand
 Haplinis antipodiana Blest & Vink, 2002 — New Zealand
 Haplinis attenuata Blest & Vink, 2002 — New Zealand
 Haplinis australis Blest & Vink, 2003 — Tasmania
 Haplinis banksi (Blest, 1979) — New Zealand
 Haplinis brevipes (Blest, 1979) — Chatham Islands
 Haplinis chiltoni (Hogg, 1911) — New Zealand
 Haplinis contorta (Blest, 1979) — New Zealand
 Haplinis diloris (Urquhart, 1886) — New Zealand
 Haplinis dunstani (Blest, 1979) — New Zealand
 Haplinis exigua Blest & Vink, 2002 — New Zealand
 Haplinis fluviatilis (Blest, 1979) — New Zealand
 Haplinis fucatinia (Urquhart, 1894) — New Zealand
 Haplinis fulvolineata Blest & Vink, 2002 — New Zealand
 Haplinis horningi (Blest, 1979) — New Zealand
 Haplinis inexacta (Blest, 1979) — New Zealand
 Haplinis innotabilis (Blest, 1979) — New Zealand
 Haplinis insignis (Blest, 1979) — New Zealand
 Haplinis major (Blest, 1979) — New Zealand
 Haplinis marplesi Blest & Vink, 2003 — New Zealand
 Haplinis minutissima (Blest, 1979) — New Zealand
 Haplinis morainicola Blest & Vink, 2002 — New Zealand
 Haplinis mundenia (Urquhart, 1894) — New Zealand
 Haplinis paradoxa (Blest, 1979) — New Zealand
 Haplinis redacta (Blest, 1979) — New Zealand
 Haplinis rufocephala (Urquhart, 1888) — New Zealand
 Haplinis rupicola (Blest, 1979) — New Zealand
 Haplinis silvicola (Blest, 1979) — New Zealand
 Haplinis similis (Blest, 1979) — New Zealand
 Haplinis subclathrata Simon, 1894 (type species) — New Zealand
 Haplinis subdola (O. P.-Cambridge, 1879) — New Zealand
 Haplinis subtilis Blest & Vink, 2002 — New Zealand
 Haplinis taranakii (Blest, 1979) — New Zealand
 Haplinis tegulata (Blest, 1979) — New Zealand
 Haplinis titan (Blest, 1979) — New Zealand
 Haplinis tokaanuae Blest & Vink, 2002 — New Zealand
 Haplinis wairarapa Blest & Vink, 2002 — New Zealand

Haplomaro
Haplomaro Miller, 1970
 Haplomaro denisi Miller, 1970 — Angola

Helophora
Helophora Menge, 1866
 Helophora insignis (Blackwall, 1841) (type species) — Holarctic
 Helophora kueideensis Hu, 2001 — China
 Helophora orinoma (Chamberlin, 1919) — USA
 Helophora reducta (Keyserling, 1886) — USA, Alaska
 Helophora tunagyna Chamberlin & Ivie, 1943 — USA

Helsdingenia
Helsdingenia Saaristo & Tanasevitch, 2003
 Helsdingenia ceylonica (van Helsdingen, 1985) (type species) — Nepal, Sri Lanka
 Helsdingenia extensa (Locket, 1968) — St. Helena, Africa, Madagascar, Comoro Islands
 Helsdingenia hebes (Locket & Russell-Smith, 1980) — Nigeria, Cameroon
 Helsdingenia hebesoides Saaristo & Tanasevitch, 2003 — Sumatra

Herbiphantes
Herbiphantes Tanasevitch, 1992
 Herbiphantes acutalis Irfan & Peng, 2019 — China
 Herbiphantes cericeus (Saito, 1934) — Russia, Korea, Japan
 Herbiphantes longiventris Tanasevitch, 1992 (type species) — Russia, Japan
 Herbiphantes pratensis Tanasevitch, 1992 — Russia

Heterolinyphia
Heterolinyphia Wunderlich, 1973
 Heterolinyphia secunda Thaler, 1999 — Bhutan
 Heterolinyphia tarakotensis Wunderlich, 1973 (type species) — Nepal, Kashmir

Heterotrichoncus
Heterotrichoncus Wunderlich, 1970
 Heterotrichoncus pusillus (Miller, 1958) — Austria, Czech Republic, Slovakia, Russia

Hilaira
Hilaira Simon, 1884
 Hilaira asiatica Eskov, 1987 — Russia
 Hilaira banini Marusik & Tanasevitch, 2003 — Mongolia
 Hilaira canaliculata (Emerton, 1915) — Russia, USA, Canada
 Hilaira dapaensis Wunderlich, 1983 — Nepal
 Hilaira devitata Eskov, 1987 — Russia
 Hilaira excisa (O. P.-Cambridge, 1871) (type species) — Europe, Russia
 Hilaira gertschi Holm, 1960 — Wrangel Islands, Alaska
 Hilaira gibbosa Tanasevitch, 1982 — Russia, Mongolia, Canada
 Hilaira glacialis (Thorell, 1871) — Norway, Russia
 Hilaira herniosa (Thorell, 1875) — Holarctic
 Hilaira hyperborea (Kulczyński, 1908) - Russia 
 Hilaira incondita (L. Koch, 1879) — Russia
 Hilaira jamalensis Eskov, 1981 — Russia
 Hilaira marusiki Eskov, 1987 — Russia, Mongolia
 Hilaira meridionalis Tanasevitch, 2013 — Russia
 Hilaira minuta Eskov, 1979 — Russia, Mongolia
 Hilaira nivalis Holm, 1937 — Russia
 Hilaira nubigena Hull, 1911 — Palearctic, Alaska
 Hilaira pelikena Eskov, 1987 — Russia
 Hilaira pervicax Hull, 1908 — Palearctic
 Hilaira proletaria (L. Koch, 1879) — Russia, Alaska
 Hilaira sibirica Eskov, 1987 — Russia, Mongolia, Canada
 Hilaira syrojeczkovskii Eskov, 1981 — Russia
 Hilaira tuberculifera Sha & Zhu, 1995 — China
 Hilaira vexatrix (O. P.-Cambridge, 1877) — Holarctic

Himalaphantes
Himalaphantes Tanasevitch, 1992
 Himalaphantes azumiensis (Oi, 1979) — Russia, China, Japan
 Himalaphantes grandiculus (Tanasevitch, 1987) (type species) — Nepal
 Himalaphantes magnus (Tanasevitch, 1987) — Nepal
 Himalaphantes martensi (Thaler, 1987) — Kashmir, Nepal

Holma
Holma Locket, 1974
 Holma bispicata Locket, 1974 — Angola

Holmelgonia
Holmelgonia Jocque & Scharff, 2007
 Holmelgonia afromontana Nzigidahera & Jocqué, 2014 
 Holmelgonia annemetteae (Scharff, 1990) — Tanzania
 Holmelgonia annulata (Jocque & Scharff, 1986) — Tanzania
 Holmelgonia basalis (Jocque & Scharff, 1986) — Tanzania
 Holmelgonia bosnasutus Nzigidahera & Jocqué, 2014 - Burundi 
 Holmelgonia brachystegiae (Jocque, 1981) — Malawi
 Holmelgonia disconveniens Nzigidahera & Jocqué, 2014 -  Burundi 
 Holmelgonia falciformis (Scharff, 1990) — Tanzania
 Holmelgonia hirsuta (Miller, 1970) — Angola
 Holmelgonia holmi (Miller, 1970) — Cameroon, Congo
 Holmelgonia limpida (Miller, 1970) — Angola
 Holmelgonia nemoralis (Holm, 1962) (type species) — Congo, Uganda, Kenya
 Holmelgonia perturbatrix (Jocque & Scharff, 1986) — Tanzania
 Holmelgonia producta (Bosmans, 1988) — Cameroon
 Holmelgonia projecta (Jocque & Scharff, 1986) — Tanzania
 Holmelgonia rungwensis (Jocque & Scharff, 1986) — Tanzania
 Holmelgonia stoltzei (Jocque & Scharff, 1986) — Tanzania

Holminaria
Holminaria Eskov, 1991
 Holminaria pallida Eskov, 1991 — Russia
 Holminaria prolata (O. P.-Cambridge, 1873) — Russia
 Holminaria sibirica Eskov, 1991 (type species) — Russia, Mongolia, China

Horcotes
Horcotes Crosby & Bishop, 1933
 Horcotes quadricristatus (Emerton, 1882) (type species) — USA
 Horcotes strandi (Sytshevskaja, 1935) — Finland, Russia, Canada
 Horcotes uncinatus Barrows, 1945 — USA

Houshenzinus
Houshenzinus Tanasevitch, 2006
 Houshenzinus rimosus Tanasevitch, 2006 (type species) — China
 Houshenzinus tengchongensis Irfan & Peng, 2018 - China
 Houshenzinus xiaolongha Zhao & Li, 2014 - China

Hubertella
Hubertella Platnick, 1989
 Hubertella montana Tanasevitch, 2019 — Nepal
 Hubertella orientalis (Georgescu, 1977) (type species) — Nepal
 Hubertella thankurensis (Wunderlich, 1983) — Nepal

Hybauchenidium
Hybauchenidium Holm, 1973
 Hybauchenidium aquilonare (L. Koch, 1879) (type species) — Russia, Alaska, Canada
 Hybauchenidium cymbadentatum (Crosby & Bishop, 1935) — USA
 Hybauchenidium ferrumequinum (Grube, 1861) — Sweden, Finland, Russia, Canada
 Hybauchenidium gibbosum (Sorensen, 1898) — Russia, Alaska, Canada, USA, Greenland

Hybocoptus
Hybocoptus Simon, 1884
 Hybocoptus corrugis (O. P.-Cambridge, 1875) (type species) — Europe, Algeria, Morocco
 Hybocoptus dubius Denis, 1950 — France
 Hybocoptus ericicola (Simon, 1881) — France, Algeria

Hylyphantes
Hylyphantes Simon, 1884
 Hylyphantes birmanicus (Thorell, 1895) — Myanmar
 Hylyphantes geniculatus Tu & Li, 2003 — China
 Hylyphantes graminicola (Sundevall, 1830) — Palearctic
 Hylyphantes nigritus (Simon, 1881) (type species) — Palearctic
 Hylyphantes spirellus Tu & Li, 2005 — China
 Hylyphantes tanikawai Ono & Saito, 2001 — Ryukyu Islands

Hyperafroneta
Hyperafroneta Blest, 1979
 Hyperafroneta obscura Blest, 1979 — New Zealand

Hypomma
Hypomma Dahl, 1886
 Hypomma affine Schenkel, 1930 — Russia, Japan
 Hypomma bituberculatum (Wider, 1834) (type species) — Palearctic
 Hypomma brevitibiale (Wunderlich, 1980) — Macedonia
 Hypomma clypeatum Roewer, 1942 — Bioko
 Hypomma coalescera (Kritscher, 1966) — New Caledonia
 Hypomma cornutum (Blackwall, 1833) — Palearctic
 Hypomma fulvum (Bösenberg, 1902) — Palearctic
 Hypomma marxi (Keyserling, 1886) — USA
 Hypomma nordlandicum Chamberlin & Ivie, 1947 — Alaska
 Hypomma subarcticum Chamberlin & Ivie, 1947 — Alaska

Hypselistes
Hypselistes Simon, 1894
 Hypselistes acutidens Gao, Sha & Zhu, 1989 — China
 Hypselistes asiaticus Bösenberg & Strand, 1906 — Japan
 Hypselistes australis Saito & Ono, 2001 — Russia, Japan
 Hypselistes basarukini Marusik & Leech, 1993 — Russia
 Hypselistes florens (O. P.-Cambridge, 1875) (type species) — USA, Canada, possibly Britain
 Hypselistes florens bulbiceps Chamberlin & Ivie, 1935 — USA
 Hypselistes fossilobus Fei & Zhu, 1993 — Russia, China
 Hypselistes jacksoni (O. P.-Cambridge, 1902) — Holarctic
 Hypselistes kolymensis Marusik & Leech, 1993 — Russia
 Hypselistes semiflavus (L. Koch, 1879) — Russia, Japan

Hypselocara
Hypselocara Millidge, 1991
 Hypselocara altissimum (Simon, 1894) — Venezuela

Hypsocephalus
Hypsocephalus Millidge, 1978
 Hypsocephalus huberti (Millidge, 1975) — Corsica
 Hypsocephalus nesiotes (Simon, 1914) — Corsica
 Hypsocephalus paulae (Simon, 1918) — France, Switzerland, Italy
 Hypsocephalus pusillus (Menge, 1869) (type species) — Europe, Ukraine

See also
List of Linyphiidae species (I–P)
List of Linyphiidae species (Q–Z)

References

Lists of spider species by family